

610001–610100 

|-bgcolor=#fefefe
| 610001 ||  || — || November 1, 2005 || Mount Lemmon || Mount Lemmon Survey ||  || align=right data-sort-value="0.79" | 790 m || 
|-id=002 bgcolor=#d6d6d6
| 610002 ||  || — || November 9, 2013 || Haleakala || Pan-STARRS || 3:2 || align=right | 3.0 km || 
|-id=003 bgcolor=#fefefe
| 610003 ||  || — || November 10, 2005 || Kitt Peak || Spacewatch ||  || align=right data-sort-value="0.66" | 660 m || 
|-id=004 bgcolor=#fefefe
| 610004 ||  || — || May 9, 2011 || Mount Lemmon || Mount Lemmon Survey ||  || align=right data-sort-value="0.74" | 740 m || 
|-id=005 bgcolor=#d6d6d6
| 610005 ||  || — || November 7, 2005 || Mauna Kea || Mauna Kea Obs. ||  || align=right | 2.6 km || 
|-id=006 bgcolor=#E9E9E9
| 610006 ||  || — || November 7, 2005 || Mauna Kea || Mauna Kea Obs. ||  || align=right data-sort-value="0.64" | 640 m || 
|-id=007 bgcolor=#fefefe
| 610007 ||  || — || July 5, 2016 || Haleakala || Pan-STARRS ||  || align=right data-sort-value="0.75" | 750 m || 
|-id=008 bgcolor=#d6d6d6
| 610008 ||  || — || November 1, 2005 || Mount Lemmon || Mount Lemmon Survey ||  || align=right | 2.3 km || 
|-id=009 bgcolor=#d6d6d6
| 610009 ||  || — || January 3, 2017 || Haleakala || Pan-STARRS ||  || align=right | 2.5 km || 
|-id=010 bgcolor=#d6d6d6
| 610010 ||  || — || April 13, 2008 || Kitt Peak || Spacewatch ||  || align=right | 2.2 km || 
|-id=011 bgcolor=#d6d6d6
| 610011 ||  || — || November 6, 2005 || Kitt Peak || Spacewatch ||  || align=right | 2.9 km || 
|-id=012 bgcolor=#d6d6d6
| 610012 ||  || — || November 7, 2005 || Mauna Kea || Mauna Kea Obs. ||  || align=right | 2.3 km || 
|-id=013 bgcolor=#d6d6d6
| 610013 ||  || — || November 1, 2005 || Kitt Peak || Spacewatch ||  || align=right | 1.9 km || 
|-id=014 bgcolor=#d6d6d6
| 610014 ||  || — || November 3, 2005 || Mount Lemmon || Mount Lemmon Survey ||  || align=right | 2.3 km || 
|-id=015 bgcolor=#fefefe
| 610015 ||  || — || October 25, 2001 || Kitt Peak || Spacewatch ||  || align=right data-sort-value="0.77" | 770 m || 
|-id=016 bgcolor=#d6d6d6
| 610016 ||  || — || November 22, 2005 || Kitt Peak || Spacewatch || 3:2 || align=right | 3.7 km || 
|-id=017 bgcolor=#d6d6d6
| 610017 ||  || — || November 22, 2005 || Kitt Peak || Spacewatch ||  || align=right | 2.2 km || 
|-id=018 bgcolor=#d6d6d6
| 610018 ||  || — || November 25, 2005 || Mount Lemmon || Mount Lemmon Survey ||  || align=right | 2.4 km || 
|-id=019 bgcolor=#d6d6d6
| 610019 ||  || — || November 25, 2005 || Mount Lemmon || Mount Lemmon Survey ||  || align=right | 1.9 km || 
|-id=020 bgcolor=#fefefe
| 610020 ||  || — || November 25, 2005 || Mount Lemmon || Mount Lemmon Survey ||  || align=right | 1.1 km || 
|-id=021 bgcolor=#d6d6d6
| 610021 ||  || — || October 27, 2005 || Mount Lemmon || Mount Lemmon Survey ||  || align=right | 3.7 km || 
|-id=022 bgcolor=#d6d6d6
| 610022 ||  || — || October 26, 2005 || Kitt Peak || Spacewatch ||  || align=right | 2.4 km || 
|-id=023 bgcolor=#fefefe
| 610023 ||  || — || November 26, 2005 || Mount Lemmon || Mount Lemmon Survey || H || align=right data-sort-value="0.62" | 620 m || 
|-id=024 bgcolor=#d6d6d6
| 610024 ||  || — || November 25, 2005 || Kitt Peak || Spacewatch ||  || align=right | 2.3 km || 
|-id=025 bgcolor=#d6d6d6
| 610025 ||  || — || November 26, 2005 || Mount Lemmon || Mount Lemmon Survey ||  || align=right | 2.1 km || 
|-id=026 bgcolor=#d6d6d6
| 610026 ||  || — || October 29, 2005 || Mount Lemmon || Mount Lemmon Survey ||  || align=right | 2.1 km || 
|-id=027 bgcolor=#d6d6d6
| 610027 ||  || — || October 30, 2005 || Mount Lemmon || Mount Lemmon Survey ||  || align=right | 3.9 km || 
|-id=028 bgcolor=#d6d6d6
| 610028 ||  || — || November 25, 2005 || Mount Lemmon || Mount Lemmon Survey ||  || align=right | 2.5 km || 
|-id=029 bgcolor=#d6d6d6
| 610029 ||  || — || November 25, 2005 || Mount Lemmon || Mount Lemmon Survey ||  || align=right | 2.3 km || 
|-id=030 bgcolor=#d6d6d6
| 610030 ||  || — || November 25, 2005 || Mount Lemmon || Mount Lemmon Survey ||  || align=right | 2.9 km || 
|-id=031 bgcolor=#d6d6d6
| 610031 ||  || — || November 26, 2005 || Kitt Peak || Spacewatch ||  || align=right | 2.9 km || 
|-id=032 bgcolor=#d6d6d6
| 610032 ||  || — || November 1, 2005 || Mount Lemmon || Mount Lemmon Survey ||  || align=right | 2.2 km || 
|-id=033 bgcolor=#d6d6d6
| 610033 ||  || — || November 26, 2005 || Kitt Peak || Spacewatch ||  || align=right | 2.8 km || 
|-id=034 bgcolor=#d6d6d6
| 610034 ||  || — || November 26, 2005 || Kitt Peak || Spacewatch ||  || align=right | 2.4 km || 
|-id=035 bgcolor=#d6d6d6
| 610035 ||  || — || November 29, 2005 || Kitt Peak || Spacewatch ||  || align=right | 2.8 km || 
|-id=036 bgcolor=#d6d6d6
| 610036 ||  || — || November 29, 2005 || Mount Lemmon || Mount Lemmon Survey ||  || align=right | 2.5 km || 
|-id=037 bgcolor=#fefefe
| 610037 ||  || — || October 25, 2005 || Catalina || CSS ||  || align=right data-sort-value="0.98" | 980 m || 
|-id=038 bgcolor=#d6d6d6
| 610038 ||  || — || November 30, 2005 || Mount Lemmon || Mount Lemmon Survey ||  || align=right | 2.1 km || 
|-id=039 bgcolor=#d6d6d6
| 610039 ||  || — || November 25, 2005 || Mount Lemmon || Mount Lemmon Survey ||  || align=right | 2.1 km || 
|-id=040 bgcolor=#d6d6d6
| 610040 ||  || — || November 25, 2005 || Mount Lemmon || Mount Lemmon Survey ||  || align=right | 2.1 km || 
|-id=041 bgcolor=#fefefe
| 610041 ||  || — || November 25, 2005 || Mount Lemmon || Mount Lemmon Survey ||  || align=right data-sort-value="0.93" | 930 m || 
|-id=042 bgcolor=#d6d6d6
| 610042 ||  || — || October 1, 2005 || Mount Lemmon || Mount Lemmon Survey ||  || align=right | 2.1 km || 
|-id=043 bgcolor=#d6d6d6
| 610043 ||  || — || November 25, 2005 || Mount Lemmon || Mount Lemmon Survey ||  || align=right | 2.3 km || 
|-id=044 bgcolor=#fefefe
| 610044 ||  || — || November 25, 2005 || Mount Lemmon || Mount Lemmon Survey ||  || align=right data-sort-value="0.78" | 780 m || 
|-id=045 bgcolor=#d6d6d6
| 610045 ||  || — || November 25, 2005 || Mount Lemmon || Mount Lemmon Survey ||  || align=right | 2.0 km || 
|-id=046 bgcolor=#d6d6d6
| 610046 ||  || — || November 25, 2005 || Mount Lemmon || Mount Lemmon Survey ||  || align=right | 2.4 km || 
|-id=047 bgcolor=#d6d6d6
| 610047 ||  || — || November 28, 2005 || Mount Lemmon || Mount Lemmon Survey ||  || align=right | 2.0 km || 
|-id=048 bgcolor=#d6d6d6
| 610048 ||  || — || November 28, 2005 || Mount Lemmon || Mount Lemmon Survey ||  || align=right | 1.7 km || 
|-id=049 bgcolor=#d6d6d6
| 610049 ||  || — || November 10, 2005 || Mount Lemmon || Mount Lemmon Survey ||  || align=right | 2.9 km || 
|-id=050 bgcolor=#d6d6d6
| 610050 ||  || — || November 30, 2005 || Kitt Peak || Spacewatch ||  || align=right | 2.4 km || 
|-id=051 bgcolor=#d6d6d6
| 610051 ||  || — || November 30, 2005 || Kitt Peak || Spacewatch ||  || align=right | 2.4 km || 
|-id=052 bgcolor=#d6d6d6
| 610052 ||  || — || November 30, 2005 || Kitt Peak || Spacewatch ||  || align=right | 1.7 km || 
|-id=053 bgcolor=#E9E9E9
| 610053 ||  || — || November 25, 2005 || Catalina || CSS ||  || align=right data-sort-value="0.82" | 820 m || 
|-id=054 bgcolor=#d6d6d6
| 610054 ||  || — || November 29, 2005 || Catalina || CSS ||  || align=right | 2.9 km || 
|-id=055 bgcolor=#d6d6d6
| 610055 ||  || — || November 26, 2005 || Mount Lemmon || Mount Lemmon Survey ||  || align=right | 2.7 km || 
|-id=056 bgcolor=#fefefe
| 610056 ||  || — || November 29, 2005 || Kitt Peak || Spacewatch ||  || align=right data-sort-value="0.48" | 480 m || 
|-id=057 bgcolor=#d6d6d6
| 610057 ||  || — || November 25, 2005 || Mount Lemmon || Mount Lemmon Survey ||  || align=right | 2.6 km || 
|-id=058 bgcolor=#d6d6d6
| 610058 ||  || — || November 30, 2005 || Mount Lemmon || Mount Lemmon Survey ||  || align=right | 2.4 km || 
|-id=059 bgcolor=#d6d6d6
| 610059 ||  || — || January 28, 2007 || Mount Lemmon || Mount Lemmon Survey ||  || align=right | 2.2 km || 
|-id=060 bgcolor=#d6d6d6
| 610060 ||  || — || November 29, 2005 || Kitt Peak || Spacewatch || SHU3:2 || align=right | 3.4 km || 
|-id=061 bgcolor=#fefefe
| 610061 ||  || — || November 21, 2005 || Kitt Peak || Spacewatch || H || align=right data-sort-value="0.72" | 720 m || 
|-id=062 bgcolor=#fefefe
| 610062 ||  || — || April 21, 2004 || Kitt Peak || Spacewatch ||  || align=right data-sort-value="0.78" | 780 m || 
|-id=063 bgcolor=#d6d6d6
| 610063 ||  || — || October 29, 2005 || Mount Lemmon || Mount Lemmon Survey || SHU3:2 || align=right | 4.2 km || 
|-id=064 bgcolor=#d6d6d6
| 610064 ||  || — || November 22, 2005 || Kitt Peak || Spacewatch ||  || align=right | 2.6 km || 
|-id=065 bgcolor=#d6d6d6
| 610065 ||  || — || November 30, 2005 || Kitt Peak || Spacewatch ||  || align=right | 2.2 km || 
|-id=066 bgcolor=#fefefe
| 610066 ||  || — || November 25, 2005 || Mount Lemmon || Mount Lemmon Survey ||  || align=right data-sort-value="0.57" | 570 m || 
|-id=067 bgcolor=#d6d6d6
| 610067 ||  || — || July 23, 2015 || Haleakala || Pan-STARRS ||  || align=right | 2.1 km || 
|-id=068 bgcolor=#E9E9E9
| 610068 ||  || — || March 2, 2011 || Mount Lemmon || Mount Lemmon Survey ||  || align=right data-sort-value="0.81" | 810 m || 
|-id=069 bgcolor=#fefefe
| 610069 ||  || — || August 1, 2016 || Haleakala || Pan-STARRS ||  || align=right data-sort-value="0.75" | 750 m || 
|-id=070 bgcolor=#d6d6d6
| 610070 ||  || — || November 28, 2005 || Palomar || NEAT ||  || align=right | 2.1 km || 
|-id=071 bgcolor=#d6d6d6
| 610071 ||  || — || November 26, 2005 || Kitt Peak || Spacewatch ||  || align=right | 2.9 km || 
|-id=072 bgcolor=#d6d6d6
| 610072 ||  || — || November 29, 2005 || Kitt Peak || Spacewatch ||  || align=right | 2.1 km || 
|-id=073 bgcolor=#d6d6d6
| 610073 ||  || — || November 21, 2005 || Kitt Peak || Spacewatch ||  || align=right | 2.7 km || 
|-id=074 bgcolor=#d6d6d6
| 610074 ||  || — || November 25, 2005 || Kitt Peak || Spacewatch ||  || align=right | 2.5 km || 
|-id=075 bgcolor=#fefefe
| 610075 ||  || — || November 25, 2005 || Kitt Peak || Spacewatch ||  || align=right data-sort-value="0.58" | 580 m || 
|-id=076 bgcolor=#d6d6d6
| 610076 ||  || — || December 1, 2005 || Kitt Peak || Spacewatch ||  || align=right | 2.6 km || 
|-id=077 bgcolor=#d6d6d6
| 610077 ||  || — || December 1, 2005 || Kitt Peak || Spacewatch ||  || align=right | 2.1 km || 
|-id=078 bgcolor=#d6d6d6
| 610078 ||  || — || December 1, 2005 || Kitt Peak || Spacewatch ||  || align=right | 2.4 km || 
|-id=079 bgcolor=#d6d6d6
| 610079 ||  || — || December 1, 2005 || Kitt Peak || Spacewatch ||  || align=right | 1.6 km || 
|-id=080 bgcolor=#fefefe
| 610080 ||  || — || December 1, 2005 || Kitt Peak || Spacewatch ||  || align=right data-sort-value="0.68" | 680 m || 
|-id=081 bgcolor=#d6d6d6
| 610081 ||  || — || December 2, 2005 || Kitt Peak || Spacewatch ||  || align=right | 2.4 km || 
|-id=082 bgcolor=#d6d6d6
| 610082 ||  || — || December 6, 2005 || Junk Bond || D. Healy ||  || align=right | 2.8 km || 
|-id=083 bgcolor=#d6d6d6
| 610083 ||  || — || January 12, 1996 || Kitt Peak || Spacewatch ||  || align=right | 3.4 km || 
|-id=084 bgcolor=#fefefe
| 610084 ||  || — || December 2, 2005 || Kitt Peak || Spacewatch ||  || align=right data-sort-value="0.98" | 980 m || 
|-id=085 bgcolor=#d6d6d6
| 610085 ||  || — || December 5, 2005 || Kitt Peak || Spacewatch ||  || align=right | 1.9 km || 
|-id=086 bgcolor=#d6d6d6
| 610086 ||  || — || December 6, 2005 || Kitt Peak || Spacewatch ||  || align=right | 3.0 km || 
|-id=087 bgcolor=#d6d6d6
| 610087 ||  || — || December 7, 2005 || Kitt Peak || Spacewatch ||  || align=right | 2.4 km || 
|-id=088 bgcolor=#d6d6d6
| 610088 ||  || — || December 2, 2005 || Kitt Peak || Spacewatch ||  || align=right | 1.9 km || 
|-id=089 bgcolor=#d6d6d6
| 610089 ||  || — || December 2, 2005 || Kitt Peak || Spacewatch ||  || align=right | 2.5 km || 
|-id=090 bgcolor=#d6d6d6
| 610090 ||  || — || December 2, 2005 || Kitt Peak || Spacewatch ||  || align=right | 2.3 km || 
|-id=091 bgcolor=#d6d6d6
| 610091 ||  || — || December 2, 2005 || Kitt Peak || Spacewatch ||  || align=right | 2.1 km || 
|-id=092 bgcolor=#d6d6d6
| 610092 ||  || — || December 2, 2005 || Kitt Peak || Spacewatch ||  || align=right | 3.0 km || 
|-id=093 bgcolor=#E9E9E9
| 610093 ||  || — || December 2, 2005 || Kitt Peak || Spacewatch ||  || align=right data-sort-value="0.75" | 750 m || 
|-id=094 bgcolor=#d6d6d6
| 610094 ||  || — || December 2, 2005 || Kitt Peak || Spacewatch ||  || align=right | 2.7 km || 
|-id=095 bgcolor=#d6d6d6
| 610095 ||  || — || September 22, 2004 || Kitt Peak || Spacewatch ||  || align=right | 2.8 km || 
|-id=096 bgcolor=#d6d6d6
| 610096 ||  || — || December 5, 2005 || Mount Lemmon || Mount Lemmon Survey ||  || align=right | 2.4 km || 
|-id=097 bgcolor=#d6d6d6
| 610097 ||  || — || December 2, 2005 || Mount Lemmon || Mount Lemmon Survey ||  || align=right | 2.1 km || 
|-id=098 bgcolor=#d6d6d6
| 610098 ||  || — || December 4, 2005 || Kitt Peak || Spacewatch ||  || align=right | 1.8 km || 
|-id=099 bgcolor=#E9E9E9
| 610099 ||  || — || November 25, 2005 || Kitt Peak || Spacewatch ||  || align=right data-sort-value="0.96" | 960 m || 
|-id=100 bgcolor=#d6d6d6
| 610100 ||  || — || December 6, 2005 || Kitt Peak || Spacewatch ||  || align=right | 1.8 km || 
|}

610101–610200 

|-bgcolor=#d6d6d6
| 610101 ||  || — || December 26, 2000 || Kitt Peak || Spacewatch ||  || align=right | 3.6 km || 
|-id=102 bgcolor=#d6d6d6
| 610102 ||  || — || December 6, 2005 || Kitt Peak || Spacewatch ||  || align=right | 3.1 km || 
|-id=103 bgcolor=#d6d6d6
| 610103 ||  || — || December 6, 2005 || Kitt Peak || Spacewatch ||  || align=right | 1.9 km || 
|-id=104 bgcolor=#d6d6d6
| 610104 ||  || — || December 6, 2005 || Kitt Peak || Spacewatch ||  || align=right | 2.4 km || 
|-id=105 bgcolor=#fefefe
| 610105 ||  || — || December 6, 2005 || Kitt Peak || Spacewatch ||  || align=right data-sort-value="0.96" | 960 m || 
|-id=106 bgcolor=#d6d6d6
| 610106 ||  || — || December 10, 2005 || Kitt Peak || Spacewatch || 3:2 || align=right | 3.3 km || 
|-id=107 bgcolor=#d6d6d6
| 610107 ||  || — || November 3, 2005 || Mount Lemmon || Mount Lemmon Survey ||  || align=right | 3.4 km || 
|-id=108 bgcolor=#d6d6d6
| 610108 ||  || — || December 7, 2005 || Kitt Peak || Spacewatch ||  || align=right | 3.1 km || 
|-id=109 bgcolor=#d6d6d6
| 610109 ||  || — || December 7, 2005 || Kitt Peak || Spacewatch ||  || align=right | 3.3 km || 
|-id=110 bgcolor=#d6d6d6
| 610110 ||  || — || December 8, 2005 || Kitt Peak || Spacewatch ||  || align=right | 2.3 km || 
|-id=111 bgcolor=#d6d6d6
| 610111 ||  || — || December 10, 2005 || Kitt Peak || Spacewatch ||  || align=right | 2.2 km || 
|-id=112 bgcolor=#d6d6d6
| 610112 ||  || — || December 1, 2005 || Kitt Peak || L. H. Wasserman, R. Millis ||  || align=right | 2.0 km || 
|-id=113 bgcolor=#d6d6d6
| 610113 ||  || — || January 10, 2006 || Mount Lemmon || Mount Lemmon Survey ||  || align=right | 2.1 km || 
|-id=114 bgcolor=#fefefe
| 610114 ||  || — || December 1, 2005 || Kitt Peak || L. H. Wasserman, R. Millis ||  || align=right data-sort-value="0.43" | 430 m || 
|-id=115 bgcolor=#d6d6d6
| 610115 ||  || — || December 1, 2005 || Kitt Peak || L. H. Wasserman, R. Millis || THM || align=right | 1.9 km || 
|-id=116 bgcolor=#d6d6d6
| 610116 ||  || — || October 7, 2005 || Mauna Kea || Mauna Kea Obs. ||  || align=right | 2.3 km || 
|-id=117 bgcolor=#d6d6d6
| 610117 ||  || — || December 1, 2005 || Kitt Peak || L. H. Wasserman, R. Millis ||  || align=right | 2.8 km || 
|-id=118 bgcolor=#d6d6d6
| 610118 ||  || — || December 1, 2005 || Kitt Peak || L. H. Wasserman, R. Millis ||  || align=right | 2.1 km || 
|-id=119 bgcolor=#d6d6d6
| 610119 ||  || — || December 1, 2005 || Mount Lemmon || Mount Lemmon Survey ||  || align=right | 2.0 km || 
|-id=120 bgcolor=#d6d6d6
| 610120 ||  || — || December 3, 2005 || Mauna Kea || Mauna Kea Obs. ||  || align=right | 2.4 km || 
|-id=121 bgcolor=#d6d6d6
| 610121 ||  || — || December 3, 2005 || Mauna Kea || Mauna Kea Obs. ||  || align=right | 1.8 km || 
|-id=122 bgcolor=#d6d6d6
| 610122 ||  || — || April 7, 2008 || Kitt Peak || Spacewatch ||  || align=right | 2.4 km || 
|-id=123 bgcolor=#E9E9E9
| 610123 ||  || — || January 17, 2015 || Haleakala || Pan-STARRS ||  || align=right data-sort-value="0.74" | 740 m || 
|-id=124 bgcolor=#d6d6d6
| 610124 ||  || — || August 13, 2004 || Cerro Tololo || Cerro Tololo Obs. || 3:2 || align=right | 4.9 km || 
|-id=125 bgcolor=#d6d6d6
| 610125 ||  || — || December 6, 2005 || Kitt Peak || Spacewatch || 3:2 || align=right | 3.3 km || 
|-id=126 bgcolor=#d6d6d6
| 610126 ||  || — || December 4, 2005 || Kitt Peak || Spacewatch ||  || align=right | 2.8 km || 
|-id=127 bgcolor=#d6d6d6
| 610127 ||  || — || December 8, 2005 || Kitt Peak || Spacewatch ||  || align=right | 2.6 km || 
|-id=128 bgcolor=#d6d6d6
| 610128 ||  || — || January 2, 2011 || Mount Lemmon || Mount Lemmon Survey ||  || align=right | 2.4 km || 
|-id=129 bgcolor=#fefefe
| 610129 ||  || — || December 2, 2005 || Mauna Kea || Mauna Kea Obs. ||  || align=right data-sort-value="0.65" | 650 m || 
|-id=130 bgcolor=#fefefe
| 610130 ||  || — || December 5, 2005 || Kitt Peak || Spacewatch || H || align=right data-sort-value="0.57" | 570 m || 
|-id=131 bgcolor=#E9E9E9
| 610131 ||  || — || May 21, 2012 || Mount Lemmon || Mount Lemmon Survey ||  || align=right data-sort-value="0.92" | 920 m || 
|-id=132 bgcolor=#E9E9E9
| 610132 ||  || — || December 3, 2005 || Mauna Kea || Mauna Kea Obs. ||  || align=right data-sort-value="0.81" | 810 m || 
|-id=133 bgcolor=#d6d6d6
| 610133 ||  || — || August 30, 2014 || Mount Lemmon || Mount Lemmon Survey ||  || align=right | 2.2 km || 
|-id=134 bgcolor=#d6d6d6
| 610134 ||  || — || November 12, 2010 || Mount Lemmon || Mount Lemmon Survey ||  || align=right | 2.0 km || 
|-id=135 bgcolor=#d6d6d6
| 610135 ||  || — || December 1, 2005 || Kitt Peak || Spacewatch ||  || align=right | 2.8 km || 
|-id=136 bgcolor=#d6d6d6
| 610136 ||  || — || August 21, 2015 || Haleakala || Pan-STARRS ||  || align=right | 2.0 km || 
|-id=137 bgcolor=#d6d6d6
| 610137 ||  || — || July 30, 2008 || Kitt Peak || Spacewatch ||  || align=right | 3.0 km || 
|-id=138 bgcolor=#d6d6d6
| 610138 ||  || — || December 27, 2016 || Mount Lemmon || Mount Lemmon Survey ||  || align=right | 2.3 km || 
|-id=139 bgcolor=#d6d6d6
| 610139 ||  || — || October 10, 2015 || Haleakala || Pan-STARRS ||  || align=right | 2.1 km || 
|-id=140 bgcolor=#d6d6d6
| 610140 ||  || — || October 19, 2010 || Mount Lemmon || Mount Lemmon Survey ||  || align=right | 2.0 km || 
|-id=141 bgcolor=#d6d6d6
| 610141 ||  || — || December 2, 2005 || Mount Lemmon || Mount Lemmon Survey ||  || align=right | 2.7 km || 
|-id=142 bgcolor=#d6d6d6
| 610142 ||  || — || November 8, 2016 || Haleakala || Pan-STARRS ||  || align=right | 2.7 km || 
|-id=143 bgcolor=#fefefe
| 610143 ||  || — || December 2, 2005 || Kitt Peak || Spacewatch || H || align=right data-sort-value="0.46" | 460 m || 
|-id=144 bgcolor=#d6d6d6
| 610144 ||  || — || December 5, 2005 || Kitt Peak || Spacewatch ||  || align=right | 2.1 km || 
|-id=145 bgcolor=#fefefe
| 610145 ||  || — || December 4, 2005 || Kitt Peak || Spacewatch ||  || align=right data-sort-value="0.44" | 440 m || 
|-id=146 bgcolor=#E9E9E9
| 610146 ||  || — || December 4, 2005 || Kitt Peak || Spacewatch ||  || align=right | 1.1 km || 
|-id=147 bgcolor=#d6d6d6
| 610147 ||  || — || December 2, 2005 || Kitt Peak || Spacewatch ||  || align=right | 2.3 km || 
|-id=148 bgcolor=#d6d6d6
| 610148 ||  || — || December 2, 2005 || Mount Lemmon || Mount Lemmon Survey ||  || align=right | 2.3 km || 
|-id=149 bgcolor=#d6d6d6
| 610149 ||  || — || December 4, 2005 || Kitt Peak || Spacewatch || 3:2 || align=right | 2.8 km || 
|-id=150 bgcolor=#E9E9E9
| 610150 ||  || — || December 6, 2005 || Kitt Peak || Spacewatch ||  || align=right data-sort-value="0.71" | 710 m || 
|-id=151 bgcolor=#d6d6d6
| 610151 ||  || — || October 29, 2005 || Catalina || CSS ||  || align=right | 2.2 km || 
|-id=152 bgcolor=#d6d6d6
| 610152 ||  || — || October 25, 2005 || Mount Lemmon || Mount Lemmon Survey ||  || align=right | 2.3 km || 
|-id=153 bgcolor=#d6d6d6
| 610153 ||  || — || December 21, 2005 || Kitt Peak || Spacewatch ||  || align=right | 2.2 km || 
|-id=154 bgcolor=#d6d6d6
| 610154 ||  || — || December 21, 2005 || Kitt Peak || Spacewatch ||  || align=right | 2.9 km || 
|-id=155 bgcolor=#d6d6d6
| 610155 ||  || — || October 29, 2005 || Mount Lemmon || Mount Lemmon Survey ||  || align=right | 2.5 km || 
|-id=156 bgcolor=#d6d6d6
| 610156 ||  || — || December 24, 2005 || Kitt Peak || Spacewatch ||  || align=right | 1.9 km || 
|-id=157 bgcolor=#d6d6d6
| 610157 ||  || — || December 24, 2005 || Kitt Peak || Spacewatch ||  || align=right | 3.2 km || 
|-id=158 bgcolor=#fefefe
| 610158 ||  || — || December 24, 2005 || Kitt Peak || Spacewatch ||  || align=right data-sort-value="0.67" | 670 m || 
|-id=159 bgcolor=#d6d6d6
| 610159 ||  || — || December 22, 2005 || Kitt Peak || Spacewatch ||  || align=right | 2.3 km || 
|-id=160 bgcolor=#d6d6d6
| 610160 ||  || — || December 22, 2005 || Kitt Peak || Spacewatch ||  || align=right | 2.5 km || 
|-id=161 bgcolor=#d6d6d6
| 610161 ||  || — || December 22, 2005 || Kitt Peak || Spacewatch ||  || align=right | 2.2 km || 
|-id=162 bgcolor=#E9E9E9
| 610162 ||  || — || April 11, 2003 || Kitt Peak || Spacewatch ||  || align=right | 1.2 km || 
|-id=163 bgcolor=#E9E9E9
| 610163 ||  || — || December 22, 2005 || Kitt Peak || Spacewatch ||  || align=right data-sort-value="0.68" | 680 m || 
|-id=164 bgcolor=#d6d6d6
| 610164 ||  || — || November 30, 2005 || Mount Lemmon || Mount Lemmon Survey ||  || align=right | 2.6 km || 
|-id=165 bgcolor=#d6d6d6
| 610165 ||  || — || December 25, 2005 || Mount Lemmon || Mount Lemmon Survey ||  || align=right | 2.7 km || 
|-id=166 bgcolor=#d6d6d6
| 610166 ||  || — || December 22, 2005 || Kitt Peak || Spacewatch ||  || align=right | 2.3 km || 
|-id=167 bgcolor=#d6d6d6
| 610167 ||  || — || December 24, 2005 || Kitt Peak || Spacewatch ||  || align=right | 3.2 km || 
|-id=168 bgcolor=#d6d6d6
| 610168 ||  || — || December 8, 2005 || Kitt Peak || Spacewatch ||  || align=right | 2.9 km || 
|-id=169 bgcolor=#E9E9E9
| 610169 ||  || — || December 25, 2005 || Kitt Peak || Spacewatch ||  || align=right data-sort-value="0.92" | 920 m || 
|-id=170 bgcolor=#d6d6d6
| 610170 ||  || — || April 11, 2003 || Kitt Peak || Spacewatch ||  || align=right | 3.0 km || 
|-id=171 bgcolor=#d6d6d6
| 610171 ||  || — || December 24, 2005 || Kitt Peak || Spacewatch ||  || align=right | 2.4 km || 
|-id=172 bgcolor=#d6d6d6
| 610172 ||  || — || December 24, 2005 || Kitt Peak || Spacewatch ||  || align=right | 2.3 km || 
|-id=173 bgcolor=#d6d6d6
| 610173 ||  || — || December 24, 2005 || Kitt Peak || Spacewatch || 3:2 || align=right | 2.7 km || 
|-id=174 bgcolor=#d6d6d6
| 610174 ||  || — || December 24, 2005 || Kitt Peak || Spacewatch ||  || align=right | 2.1 km || 
|-id=175 bgcolor=#d6d6d6
| 610175 ||  || — || December 1, 2005 || Mount Lemmon || Mount Lemmon Survey ||  || align=right | 2.0 km || 
|-id=176 bgcolor=#d6d6d6
| 610176 ||  || — || December 24, 2005 || Kitt Peak || Spacewatch ||  || align=right | 2.4 km || 
|-id=177 bgcolor=#d6d6d6
| 610177 ||  || — || December 24, 2005 || Kitt Peak || Spacewatch ||  || align=right | 2.5 km || 
|-id=178 bgcolor=#d6d6d6
| 610178 ||  || — || December 25, 2005 || Mount Lemmon || Mount Lemmon Survey ||  || align=right | 3.2 km || 
|-id=179 bgcolor=#d6d6d6
| 610179 ||  || — || December 25, 2005 || Mount Lemmon || Mount Lemmon Survey ||  || align=right | 2.6 km || 
|-id=180 bgcolor=#d6d6d6
| 610180 ||  || — || December 26, 2005 || Mount Lemmon || Mount Lemmon Survey ||  || align=right | 2.0 km || 
|-id=181 bgcolor=#d6d6d6
| 610181 ||  || — || December 27, 2005 || Mount Lemmon || Mount Lemmon Survey ||  || align=right | 2.8 km || 
|-id=182 bgcolor=#fefefe
| 610182 ||  || — || December 25, 2005 || Mount Lemmon || Mount Lemmon Survey ||  || align=right data-sort-value="0.49" | 490 m || 
|-id=183 bgcolor=#fefefe
| 610183 ||  || — || November 28, 2005 || Kitt Peak || Spacewatch ||  || align=right data-sort-value="0.88" | 880 m || 
|-id=184 bgcolor=#d6d6d6
| 610184 ||  || — || December 24, 2005 || Kitt Peak || Spacewatch || EOS || align=right | 1.5 km || 
|-id=185 bgcolor=#d6d6d6
| 610185 ||  || — || December 26, 2005 || Kitt Peak || Spacewatch ||  || align=right | 2.8 km || 
|-id=186 bgcolor=#d6d6d6
| 610186 ||  || — || December 25, 2005 || Kitt Peak || Spacewatch ||  || align=right | 1.8 km || 
|-id=187 bgcolor=#d6d6d6
| 610187 ||  || — || December 25, 2005 || Kitt Peak || Spacewatch ||  || align=right | 1.9 km || 
|-id=188 bgcolor=#d6d6d6
| 610188 ||  || — || December 25, 2005 || Mount Lemmon || Mount Lemmon Survey ||  || align=right | 2.2 km || 
|-id=189 bgcolor=#E9E9E9
| 610189 ||  || — || December 25, 2005 || Kitt Peak || Spacewatch ||  || align=right data-sort-value="0.76" | 760 m || 
|-id=190 bgcolor=#E9E9E9
| 610190 ||  || — || December 25, 2005 || Kitt Peak || Spacewatch ||  || align=right data-sort-value="0.77" | 770 m || 
|-id=191 bgcolor=#d6d6d6
| 610191 ||  || — || December 25, 2005 || Kitt Peak || Spacewatch ||  || align=right | 2.1 km || 
|-id=192 bgcolor=#d6d6d6
| 610192 ||  || — || December 25, 2005 || Mount Lemmon || Mount Lemmon Survey ||  || align=right | 2.1 km || 
|-id=193 bgcolor=#d6d6d6
| 610193 ||  || — || December 25, 2005 || Kitt Peak || Spacewatch ||  || align=right | 1.8 km || 
|-id=194 bgcolor=#E9E9E9
| 610194 ||  || — || December 25, 2005 || Kitt Peak || Spacewatch ||  || align=right data-sort-value="0.74" | 740 m || 
|-id=195 bgcolor=#d6d6d6
| 610195 ||  || — || December 26, 2005 || Kitt Peak || Spacewatch ||  || align=right | 2.9 km || 
|-id=196 bgcolor=#d6d6d6
| 610196 ||  || — || December 26, 2005 || Kitt Peak || Spacewatch ||  || align=right | 3.6 km || 
|-id=197 bgcolor=#d6d6d6
| 610197 ||  || — || December 5, 2005 || Mount Lemmon || Mount Lemmon Survey ||  || align=right | 2.0 km || 
|-id=198 bgcolor=#E9E9E9
| 610198 ||  || — || December 26, 2005 || Kitt Peak || Spacewatch ||  || align=right data-sort-value="0.92" | 920 m || 
|-id=199 bgcolor=#d6d6d6
| 610199 ||  || — || December 5, 2005 || Mount Lemmon || Mount Lemmon Survey || SHU3:2 || align=right | 4.2 km || 
|-id=200 bgcolor=#E9E9E9
| 610200 ||  || — || April 29, 2003 || Kitt Peak || Spacewatch ||  || align=right data-sort-value="0.97" | 970 m || 
|}

610201–610300 

|-bgcolor=#d6d6d6
| 610201 ||  || — || December 26, 2005 || Kitt Peak || Spacewatch ||  || align=right | 2.2 km || 
|-id=202 bgcolor=#E9E9E9
| 610202 ||  || — || December 4, 2005 || Kitt Peak || Spacewatch ||  || align=right data-sort-value="0.89" | 890 m || 
|-id=203 bgcolor=#fefefe
| 610203 ||  || — || December 28, 2005 || Kitt Peak || Spacewatch ||  || align=right data-sort-value="0.56" | 560 m || 
|-id=204 bgcolor=#d6d6d6
| 610204 ||  || — || December 28, 2005 || Mount Lemmon || Mount Lemmon Survey || EOS || align=right | 1.3 km || 
|-id=205 bgcolor=#E9E9E9
| 610205 ||  || — || December 28, 2005 || Mount Lemmon || Mount Lemmon Survey ||  || align=right data-sort-value="0.97" | 970 m || 
|-id=206 bgcolor=#d6d6d6
| 610206 ||  || — || December 28, 2005 || Mount Lemmon || Mount Lemmon Survey ||  || align=right | 2.7 km || 
|-id=207 bgcolor=#d6d6d6
| 610207 ||  || — || December 29, 2005 || Socorro || LINEAR ||  || align=right | 3.2 km || 
|-id=208 bgcolor=#E9E9E9
| 610208 ||  || — || December 29, 2005 || Mount Lemmon || Mount Lemmon Survey ||  || align=right data-sort-value="0.68" | 680 m || 
|-id=209 bgcolor=#E9E9E9
| 610209 ||  || — || December 25, 2005 || Kitt Peak || Spacewatch ||  || align=right data-sort-value="0.91" | 910 m || 
|-id=210 bgcolor=#E9E9E9
| 610210 ||  || — || December 10, 2005 || Kitt Peak || Spacewatch ||  || align=right data-sort-value="0.87" | 870 m || 
|-id=211 bgcolor=#d6d6d6
| 610211 ||  || — || November 25, 2005 || Mount Lemmon || Mount Lemmon Survey ||  || align=right | 2.7 km || 
|-id=212 bgcolor=#E9E9E9
| 610212 ||  || — || December 27, 2005 || Mount Lemmon || Mount Lemmon Survey ||  || align=right data-sort-value="0.76" | 760 m || 
|-id=213 bgcolor=#d6d6d6
| 610213 ||  || — || December 27, 2005 || Mount Lemmon || Mount Lemmon Survey || 3:2 || align=right | 4.0 km || 
|-id=214 bgcolor=#d6d6d6
| 610214 ||  || — || December 1, 2005 || Mount Lemmon || Mount Lemmon Survey ||  || align=right | 3.5 km || 
|-id=215 bgcolor=#d6d6d6
| 610215 ||  || — || December 1, 2005 || Mount Lemmon || Mount Lemmon Survey ||  || align=right | 3.0 km || 
|-id=216 bgcolor=#d6d6d6
| 610216 ||  || — || December 27, 2005 || Kitt Peak || Spacewatch ||  || align=right | 2.6 km || 
|-id=217 bgcolor=#E9E9E9
| 610217 ||  || — || December 29, 2005 || Kitt Peak || Spacewatch ||  || align=right | 1.2 km || 
|-id=218 bgcolor=#d6d6d6
| 610218 ||  || — || December 10, 2005 || Kitt Peak || Spacewatch ||  || align=right | 2.5 km || 
|-id=219 bgcolor=#d6d6d6
| 610219 ||  || — || December 31, 2005 || Kitt Peak || Spacewatch ||  || align=right | 2.4 km || 
|-id=220 bgcolor=#d6d6d6
| 610220 ||  || — || December 24, 2005 || Kitt Peak || Spacewatch ||  || align=right | 3.3 km || 
|-id=221 bgcolor=#E9E9E9
| 610221 ||  || — || December 26, 2005 || Mount Lemmon || Mount Lemmon Survey ||  || align=right data-sort-value="0.72" | 720 m || 
|-id=222 bgcolor=#d6d6d6
| 610222 ||  || — || December 28, 2005 || Mount Lemmon || Mount Lemmon Survey ||  || align=right | 2.9 km || 
|-id=223 bgcolor=#d6d6d6
| 610223 ||  || — || December 27, 2005 || Kitt Peak || Spacewatch ||  || align=right | 2.0 km || 
|-id=224 bgcolor=#d6d6d6
| 610224 ||  || — || December 27, 2005 || Kitt Peak || Spacewatch || 3:2 || align=right | 2.8 km || 
|-id=225 bgcolor=#d6d6d6
| 610225 ||  || — || December 28, 2005 || Mount Lemmon || Mount Lemmon Survey ||  || align=right | 1.9 km || 
|-id=226 bgcolor=#E9E9E9
| 610226 ||  || — || December 28, 2005 || Mount Lemmon || Mount Lemmon Survey ||  || align=right | 1.2 km || 
|-id=227 bgcolor=#d6d6d6
| 610227 ||  || — || December 29, 2005 || Kitt Peak || Spacewatch ||  || align=right | 2.5 km || 
|-id=228 bgcolor=#d6d6d6
| 610228 ||  || — || December 5, 2005 || Mount Lemmon || Mount Lemmon Survey ||  || align=right | 2.7 km || 
|-id=229 bgcolor=#d6d6d6
| 610229 ||  || — || December 30, 2005 || Kitt Peak || Spacewatch ||  || align=right | 2.9 km || 
|-id=230 bgcolor=#d6d6d6
| 610230 ||  || — || December 8, 2005 || Kitt Peak || Spacewatch ||  || align=right | 2.2 km || 
|-id=231 bgcolor=#E9E9E9
| 610231 ||  || — || December 25, 2005 || Kitt Peak || Spacewatch ||  || align=right | 1.00 km || 
|-id=232 bgcolor=#d6d6d6
| 610232 ||  || — || December 2, 2005 || Mount Lemmon || Mount Lemmon Survey ||  || align=right | 2.0 km || 
|-id=233 bgcolor=#E9E9E9
| 610233 ||  || — || December 25, 2005 || Mount Lemmon || Mount Lemmon Survey ||  || align=right data-sort-value="0.79" | 790 m || 
|-id=234 bgcolor=#d6d6d6
| 610234 ||  || — || December 25, 2005 || Kitt Peak || Spacewatch ||  || align=right | 2.2 km || 
|-id=235 bgcolor=#d6d6d6
| 610235 ||  || — || October 12, 2004 || Kitt Peak || Spacewatch ||  || align=right | 2.8 km || 
|-id=236 bgcolor=#d6d6d6
| 610236 ||  || — || December 29, 2005 || Kitt Peak || Spacewatch ||  || align=right | 2.4 km || 
|-id=237 bgcolor=#d6d6d6
| 610237 ||  || — || December 30, 2005 || Mount Lemmon || Mount Lemmon Survey ||  || align=right | 3.2 km || 
|-id=238 bgcolor=#E9E9E9
| 610238 ||  || — || December 25, 2005 || Mount Lemmon || Mount Lemmon Survey ||  || align=right data-sort-value="0.66" | 660 m || 
|-id=239 bgcolor=#d6d6d6
| 610239 ||  || — || December 4, 2005 || Mount Lemmon || Mount Lemmon Survey ||  || align=right | 2.7 km || 
|-id=240 bgcolor=#d6d6d6
| 610240 ||  || — || December 25, 2005 || Mount Lemmon || Mount Lemmon Survey ||  || align=right | 2.0 km || 
|-id=241 bgcolor=#d6d6d6
| 610241 ||  || — || December 26, 2005 || Kitt Peak || Spacewatch ||  || align=right | 2.3 km || 
|-id=242 bgcolor=#fefefe
| 610242 ||  || — || April 29, 2003 || Kitt Peak || Spacewatch ||  || align=right | 1.2 km || 
|-id=243 bgcolor=#fefefe
| 610243 ||  || — || December 28, 2005 || Mount Lemmon || Mount Lemmon Survey ||  || align=right data-sort-value="0.59" | 590 m || 
|-id=244 bgcolor=#d6d6d6
| 610244 ||  || — || December 28, 2005 || Mount Lemmon || Mount Lemmon Survey ||  || align=right | 1.9 km || 
|-id=245 bgcolor=#d6d6d6
| 610245 ||  || — || December 29, 2005 || Kitt Peak || Spacewatch ||  || align=right | 3.9 km || 
|-id=246 bgcolor=#d6d6d6
| 610246 ||  || — || December 30, 2005 || Kitt Peak || Spacewatch ||  || align=right | 3.1 km || 
|-id=247 bgcolor=#E9E9E9
| 610247 ||  || — || December 30, 2005 || Kitt Peak || Spacewatch ||  || align=right data-sort-value="0.81" | 810 m || 
|-id=248 bgcolor=#d6d6d6
| 610248 ||  || — || August 4, 2003 || Kitt Peak || Spacewatch ||  || align=right | 2.6 km || 
|-id=249 bgcolor=#d6d6d6
| 610249 ||  || — || February 20, 2001 || Kitt Peak || Spacewatch ||  || align=right | 3.4 km || 
|-id=250 bgcolor=#E9E9E9
| 610250 ||  || — || December 28, 2005 || Kitt Peak || Spacewatch ||  || align=right data-sort-value="0.76" | 760 m || 
|-id=251 bgcolor=#fefefe
| 610251 ||  || — || December 28, 2005 || Mount Lemmon || Mount Lemmon Survey ||  || align=right data-sort-value="0.50" | 500 m || 
|-id=252 bgcolor=#E9E9E9
| 610252 ||  || — || December 28, 2005 || Kitt Peak || Spacewatch ||  || align=right | 1.3 km || 
|-id=253 bgcolor=#d6d6d6
| 610253 ||  || — || December 29, 2005 || Kitt Peak || Spacewatch ||  || align=right | 3.2 km || 
|-id=254 bgcolor=#d6d6d6
| 610254 ||  || — || September 18, 2003 || Kitt Peak || Spacewatch ||  || align=right | 2.9 km || 
|-id=255 bgcolor=#E9E9E9
| 610255 ||  || — || December 30, 2005 || Kitt Peak || Spacewatch ||  || align=right data-sort-value="0.91" | 910 m || 
|-id=256 bgcolor=#d6d6d6
| 610256 ||  || — || December 30, 2005 || Kitt Peak || Spacewatch ||  || align=right | 3.0 km || 
|-id=257 bgcolor=#E9E9E9
| 610257 ||  || — || December 8, 2005 || Kitt Peak || Spacewatch ||  || align=right | 1.1 km || 
|-id=258 bgcolor=#E9E9E9
| 610258 ||  || — || December 24, 2005 || Kitt Peak || Spacewatch ||  || align=right data-sort-value="0.73" | 730 m || 
|-id=259 bgcolor=#d6d6d6
| 610259 ||  || — || December 25, 2005 || Kitt Peak || Spacewatch ||  || align=right | 2.5 km || 
|-id=260 bgcolor=#d6d6d6
| 610260 ||  || — || December 25, 2005 || Kitt Peak || Spacewatch ||  || align=right | 2.7 km || 
|-id=261 bgcolor=#d6d6d6
| 610261 ||  || — || November 10, 2005 || Mount Lemmon || Mount Lemmon Survey ||  || align=right | 3.6 km || 
|-id=262 bgcolor=#d6d6d6
| 610262 ||  || — || December 25, 2005 || Kitt Peak || Spacewatch ||  || align=right | 2.1 km || 
|-id=263 bgcolor=#E9E9E9
| 610263 ||  || — || January 13, 2002 || Kitt Peak || Spacewatch ||  || align=right data-sort-value="0.88" | 880 m || 
|-id=264 bgcolor=#E9E9E9
| 610264 ||  || — || December 27, 2005 || Kitt Peak || Spacewatch ||  || align=right data-sort-value="0.99" | 990 m || 
|-id=265 bgcolor=#fefefe
| 610265 ||  || — || December 25, 2005 || Mount Lemmon || Mount Lemmon Survey ||  || align=right data-sort-value="0.68" | 680 m || 
|-id=266 bgcolor=#d6d6d6
| 610266 ||  || — || December 25, 2005 || Mount Lemmon || Mount Lemmon Survey ||  || align=right | 2.3 km || 
|-id=267 bgcolor=#d6d6d6
| 610267 ||  || — || December 25, 2005 || Mount Lemmon || Mount Lemmon Survey ||  || align=right | 2.5 km || 
|-id=268 bgcolor=#d6d6d6
| 610268 ||  || — || December 25, 2005 || Mount Lemmon || Mount Lemmon Survey ||  || align=right | 2.2 km || 
|-id=269 bgcolor=#E9E9E9
| 610269 ||  || — || December 26, 2005 || Kitt Peak || Spacewatch ||  || align=right data-sort-value="0.92" | 920 m || 
|-id=270 bgcolor=#d6d6d6
| 610270 ||  || — || December 5, 2005 || Mount Lemmon || Mount Lemmon Survey ||  || align=right | 2.9 km || 
|-id=271 bgcolor=#d6d6d6
| 610271 ||  || — || December 30, 2005 || Kitt Peak || Spacewatch ||  || align=right | 2.4 km || 
|-id=272 bgcolor=#d6d6d6
| 610272 ||  || — || November 26, 2005 || Mount Lemmon || Mount Lemmon Survey ||  || align=right | 3.2 km || 
|-id=273 bgcolor=#E9E9E9
| 610273 ||  || — || December 21, 2005 || Kitt Peak || Spacewatch ||  || align=right data-sort-value="0.87" | 870 m || 
|-id=274 bgcolor=#d6d6d6
| 610274 ||  || — || December 22, 2005 || Kitt Peak || Spacewatch ||  || align=right | 2.5 km || 
|-id=275 bgcolor=#fefefe
| 610275 ||  || — || December 25, 2005 || Kitt Peak || Spacewatch ||  || align=right data-sort-value="0.46" | 460 m || 
|-id=276 bgcolor=#d6d6d6
| 610276 ||  || — || December 25, 2005 || Kitt Peak || Spacewatch ||  || align=right | 1.8 km || 
|-id=277 bgcolor=#d6d6d6
| 610277 ||  || — || December 25, 2005 || Kitt Peak || Spacewatch || EOS || align=right | 1.3 km || 
|-id=278 bgcolor=#d6d6d6
| 610278 ||  || — || December 25, 2005 || Mount Lemmon || Mount Lemmon Survey ||  || align=right | 1.8 km || 
|-id=279 bgcolor=#d6d6d6
| 610279 ||  || — || December 25, 2005 || Mount Lemmon || Mount Lemmon Survey ||  || align=right | 2.4 km || 
|-id=280 bgcolor=#d6d6d6
| 610280 ||  || — || December 25, 2005 || Kitt Peak || Spacewatch ||  || align=right | 2.2 km || 
|-id=281 bgcolor=#fefefe
| 610281 ||  || — || December 25, 2005 || Kitt Peak || Spacewatch ||  || align=right data-sort-value="0.56" | 560 m || 
|-id=282 bgcolor=#E9E9E9
| 610282 ||  || — || December 28, 2005 || Mount Lemmon || Mount Lemmon Survey ||  || align=right data-sort-value="0.86" | 860 m || 
|-id=283 bgcolor=#E9E9E9
| 610283 ||  || — || December 28, 2005 || Mount Lemmon || Mount Lemmon Survey || MAR || align=right data-sort-value="0.81" | 810 m || 
|-id=284 bgcolor=#E9E9E9
| 610284 ||  || — || December 30, 2005 || Kitt Peak || Spacewatch ||  || align=right data-sort-value="0.78" | 780 m || 
|-id=285 bgcolor=#d6d6d6
| 610285 ||  || — || December 30, 2005 || Kitt Peak || Spacewatch ||  || align=right | 2.3 km || 
|-id=286 bgcolor=#d6d6d6
| 610286 ||  || — || December 25, 2005 || Mount Lemmon || Mount Lemmon Survey ||  || align=right | 2.1 km || 
|-id=287 bgcolor=#E9E9E9
| 610287 ||  || — || December 28, 2005 || Mount Lemmon || Mount Lemmon Survey ||  || align=right | 1.1 km || 
|-id=288 bgcolor=#E9E9E9
| 610288 ||  || — || December 31, 2005 || Kitt Peak || Spacewatch ||  || align=right data-sort-value="0.79" | 790 m || 
|-id=289 bgcolor=#fefefe
| 610289 ||  || — || April 10, 2010 || Kitt Peak || Spacewatch ||  || align=right data-sort-value="0.59" | 590 m || 
|-id=290 bgcolor=#d6d6d6
| 610290 ||  || — || July 8, 2014 || Haleakala || Pan-STARRS ||  || align=right | 2.0 km || 
|-id=291 bgcolor=#d6d6d6
| 610291 ||  || — || May 8, 2013 || Haleakala || Pan-STARRS ||  || align=right | 2.8 km || 
|-id=292 bgcolor=#d6d6d6
| 610292 ||  || — || March 16, 2012 || Haleakala || Pan-STARRS ||  || align=right | 2.1 km || 
|-id=293 bgcolor=#d6d6d6
| 610293 ||  || — || November 11, 2010 || Mount Lemmon || Mount Lemmon Survey ||  || align=right | 2.0 km || 
|-id=294 bgcolor=#d6d6d6
| 610294 ||  || — || December 27, 2005 || Mount Lemmon || Mount Lemmon Survey || 3:2 || align=right | 2.9 km || 
|-id=295 bgcolor=#d6d6d6
| 610295 ||  || — || January 19, 2012 || Haleakala || Pan-STARRS ||  || align=right | 2.6 km || 
|-id=296 bgcolor=#d6d6d6
| 610296 ||  || — || December 2, 2010 || Mount Lemmon || Mount Lemmon Survey ||  || align=right | 3.0 km || 
|-id=297 bgcolor=#E9E9E9
| 610297 ||  || — || December 13, 2013 || Mount Lemmon || Mount Lemmon Survey ||  || align=right data-sort-value="0.93" | 930 m || 
|-id=298 bgcolor=#d6d6d6
| 610298 ||  || — || February 15, 2012 || Haleakala || Pan-STARRS ||  || align=right | 3.0 km || 
|-id=299 bgcolor=#fefefe
| 610299 ||  || — || April 22, 2017 || Mount Lemmon || Mount Lemmon Survey || H || align=right data-sort-value="0.65" | 650 m || 
|-id=300 bgcolor=#d6d6d6
| 610300 ||  || — || September 23, 2015 || Haleakala || Pan-STARRS ||  || align=right | 2.0 km || 
|}

610301–610400 

|-bgcolor=#d6d6d6
| 610301 ||  || — || January 2, 2017 || Haleakala || Pan-STARRS ||  || align=right | 2.3 km || 
|-id=302 bgcolor=#d6d6d6
| 610302 ||  || — || November 12, 2010 || Mount Lemmon || Mount Lemmon Survey ||  || align=right | 2.1 km || 
|-id=303 bgcolor=#E9E9E9
| 610303 ||  || — || August 8, 2016 || Haleakala || Pan-STARRS ||  || align=right | 1.2 km || 
|-id=304 bgcolor=#d6d6d6
| 610304 ||  || — || September 4, 2014 || Haleakala || Pan-STARRS ||  || align=right | 2.0 km || 
|-id=305 bgcolor=#d6d6d6
| 610305 ||  || — || December 28, 2005 || Kitt Peak || Spacewatch ||  || align=right | 2.3 km || 
|-id=306 bgcolor=#d6d6d6
| 610306 ||  || — || December 25, 2005 || Mount Lemmon || Mount Lemmon Survey ||  || align=right | 1.8 km || 
|-id=307 bgcolor=#d6d6d6
| 610307 ||  || — || December 29, 2005 || Mount Lemmon || Mount Lemmon Survey ||  || align=right | 2.7 km || 
|-id=308 bgcolor=#d6d6d6
| 610308 ||  || — || January 5, 2006 || Catalina || CSS ||  || align=right | 4.4 km || 
|-id=309 bgcolor=#d6d6d6
| 610309 ||  || — || January 4, 2006 || Kitt Peak || Spacewatch ||  || align=right | 2.3 km || 
|-id=310 bgcolor=#d6d6d6
| 610310 ||  || — || December 6, 2005 || Mount Lemmon || Mount Lemmon Survey ||  || align=right | 3.1 km || 
|-id=311 bgcolor=#d6d6d6
| 610311 ||  || — || January 5, 2006 || Kitt Peak || Spacewatch ||  || align=right | 2.5 km || 
|-id=312 bgcolor=#E9E9E9
| 610312 ||  || — || January 4, 2006 || Kitt Peak || Spacewatch ||  || align=right data-sort-value="0.81" | 810 m || 
|-id=313 bgcolor=#d6d6d6
| 610313 ||  || — || December 25, 2005 || Mount Lemmon || Mount Lemmon Survey ||  || align=right | 1.8 km || 
|-id=314 bgcolor=#d6d6d6
| 610314 ||  || — || January 5, 2006 || Kitt Peak || Spacewatch ||  || align=right | 2.4 km || 
|-id=315 bgcolor=#d6d6d6
| 610315 ||  || — || January 5, 2006 || Mount Lemmon || Mount Lemmon Survey ||  || align=right | 2.7 km || 
|-id=316 bgcolor=#d6d6d6
| 610316 ||  || — || December 30, 2005 || Kitt Peak || Spacewatch ||  || align=right | 2.1 km || 
|-id=317 bgcolor=#d6d6d6
| 610317 ||  || — || January 5, 2006 || Kitt Peak || Spacewatch ||  || align=right | 2.9 km || 
|-id=318 bgcolor=#d6d6d6
| 610318 ||  || — || January 4, 2006 || Kitt Peak || Spacewatch ||  || align=right | 2.5 km || 
|-id=319 bgcolor=#d6d6d6
| 610319 ||  || — || December 25, 2005 || Mount Lemmon || Mount Lemmon Survey ||  || align=right | 1.7 km || 
|-id=320 bgcolor=#E9E9E9
| 610320 ||  || — || January 5, 2006 || Mount Lemmon || Mount Lemmon Survey ||  || align=right | 1.1 km || 
|-id=321 bgcolor=#E9E9E9
| 610321 ||  || — || January 6, 2006 || Kitt Peak || Spacewatch ||  || align=right data-sort-value="0.88" | 880 m || 
|-id=322 bgcolor=#E9E9E9
| 610322 ||  || — || January 5, 2006 || Kitt Peak || Spacewatch ||  || align=right | 1.3 km || 
|-id=323 bgcolor=#fefefe
| 610323 ||  || — || January 5, 2006 || Kitt Peak || Spacewatch || H || align=right data-sort-value="0.64" | 640 m || 
|-id=324 bgcolor=#d6d6d6
| 610324 ||  || — || December 2, 2005 || Mount Lemmon || Mount Lemmon Survey ||  || align=right | 3.3 km || 
|-id=325 bgcolor=#E9E9E9
| 610325 ||  || — || December 26, 2005 || Mount Lemmon || Mount Lemmon Survey ||  || align=right data-sort-value="0.82" | 820 m || 
|-id=326 bgcolor=#E9E9E9
| 610326 ||  || — || December 28, 2005 || Kitt Peak || Spacewatch ||  || align=right data-sort-value="0.85" | 850 m || 
|-id=327 bgcolor=#d6d6d6
| 610327 ||  || — || January 5, 2006 || Kitt Peak || Spacewatch ||  || align=right | 2.1 km || 
|-id=328 bgcolor=#d6d6d6
| 610328 ||  || — || January 5, 2006 || Kitt Peak || Spacewatch ||  || align=right | 2.3 km || 
|-id=329 bgcolor=#fefefe
| 610329 ||  || — || January 5, 2006 || Kitt Peak || Spacewatch ||  || align=right data-sort-value="0.50" | 500 m || 
|-id=330 bgcolor=#d6d6d6
| 610330 ||  || — || January 5, 2006 || Kitt Peak || Spacewatch ||  || align=right | 2.4 km || 
|-id=331 bgcolor=#d6d6d6
| 610331 ||  || — || January 5, 2006 || Kitt Peak || Spacewatch ||  || align=right | 2.4 km || 
|-id=332 bgcolor=#d6d6d6
| 610332 ||  || — || January 5, 2006 || Kitt Peak || Spacewatch ||  || align=right | 2.3 km || 
|-id=333 bgcolor=#E9E9E9
| 610333 ||  || — || January 9, 2006 || Kitt Peak || Spacewatch ||  || align=right data-sort-value="0.94" | 940 m || 
|-id=334 bgcolor=#d6d6d6
| 610334 ||  || — || January 5, 2006 || Mount Lemmon || Mount Lemmon Survey ||  || align=right | 2.4 km || 
|-id=335 bgcolor=#d6d6d6
| 610335 ||  || — || January 6, 2006 || Kitt Peak || Spacewatch ||  || align=right | 2.0 km || 
|-id=336 bgcolor=#d6d6d6
| 610336 ||  || — || January 5, 2006 || Kitt Peak || Spacewatch ||  || align=right | 2.2 km || 
|-id=337 bgcolor=#E9E9E9
| 610337 ||  || — || December 25, 2005 || Kitt Peak || Spacewatch ||  || align=right data-sort-value="0.83" | 830 m || 
|-id=338 bgcolor=#d6d6d6
| 610338 ||  || — || January 5, 2006 || Mount Lemmon || Mount Lemmon Survey ||  || align=right | 2.4 km || 
|-id=339 bgcolor=#d6d6d6
| 610339 ||  || — || January 5, 2006 || Mount Lemmon || Mount Lemmon Survey ||  || align=right | 2.5 km || 
|-id=340 bgcolor=#E9E9E9
| 610340 ||  || — || January 7, 2006 || Mount Lemmon || Mount Lemmon Survey ||  || align=right data-sort-value="0.87" | 870 m || 
|-id=341 bgcolor=#d6d6d6
| 610341 ||  || — || January 7, 2006 || Mount Lemmon || Mount Lemmon Survey ||  || align=right | 2.4 km || 
|-id=342 bgcolor=#E9E9E9
| 610342 ||  || — || January 7, 2006 || Kitt Peak || Spacewatch ||  || align=right | 1.3 km || 
|-id=343 bgcolor=#d6d6d6
| 610343 ||  || — || December 30, 2005 || Kitt Peak || Spacewatch ||  || align=right | 3.4 km || 
|-id=344 bgcolor=#d6d6d6
| 610344 ||  || — || January 8, 2006 || Mount Lemmon || Mount Lemmon Survey ||  || align=right | 2.5 km || 
|-id=345 bgcolor=#E9E9E9
| 610345 ||  || — || December 27, 2005 || Mount Lemmon || Mount Lemmon Survey ||  || align=right data-sort-value="0.81" | 810 m || 
|-id=346 bgcolor=#d6d6d6
| 610346 ||  || — || September 19, 2003 || Kitt Peak || Spacewatch ||  || align=right | 2.6 km || 
|-id=347 bgcolor=#d6d6d6
| 610347 ||  || — || January 7, 2006 || Mount Lemmon || Mount Lemmon Survey || TIR || align=right | 2.9 km || 
|-id=348 bgcolor=#d6d6d6
| 610348 ||  || — || January 10, 2006 || Mount Lemmon || Mount Lemmon Survey ||  || align=right | 2.9 km || 
|-id=349 bgcolor=#d6d6d6
| 610349 ||  || — || January 7, 2006 || Kitt Peak || Spacewatch ||  || align=right | 2.3 km || 
|-id=350 bgcolor=#E9E9E9
| 610350 ||  || — || January 10, 2006 || Mount Lemmon || Mount Lemmon Survey ||  || align=right data-sort-value="0.69" | 690 m || 
|-id=351 bgcolor=#E9E9E9
| 610351 ||  || — || September 24, 2008 || Catalina || CSS ||  || align=right | 1.2 km || 
|-id=352 bgcolor=#d6d6d6
| 610352 ||  || — || November 3, 2010 || Kitt Peak || Spacewatch ||  || align=right | 2.8 km || 
|-id=353 bgcolor=#d6d6d6
| 610353 ||  || — || June 12, 2013 || Haleakala || Pan-STARRS ||  || align=right | 2.9 km || 
|-id=354 bgcolor=#E9E9E9
| 610354 ||  || — || January 10, 2006 || Kitt Peak || Spacewatch ||  || align=right data-sort-value="0.64" | 640 m || 
|-id=355 bgcolor=#d6d6d6
| 610355 ||  || — || January 7, 2006 || Kitt Peak || Spacewatch ||  || align=right | 2.4 km || 
|-id=356 bgcolor=#fefefe
| 610356 ||  || — || June 16, 2012 || Haleakala || Pan-STARRS || H || align=right data-sort-value="0.58" | 580 m || 
|-id=357 bgcolor=#d6d6d6
| 610357 ||  || — || January 4, 2011 || Mount Lemmon || Mount Lemmon Survey ||  || align=right | 2.8 km || 
|-id=358 bgcolor=#d6d6d6
| 610358 ||  || — || January 5, 2006 || Kitt Peak || Spacewatch ||  || align=right | 2.3 km || 
|-id=359 bgcolor=#d6d6d6
| 610359 ||  || — || January 7, 2006 || Kitt Peak || Spacewatch ||  || align=right | 2.7 km || 
|-id=360 bgcolor=#d6d6d6
| 610360 ||  || — || January 2, 2006 || Mount Lemmon || Mount Lemmon Survey ||  || align=right | 3.0 km || 
|-id=361 bgcolor=#d6d6d6
| 610361 ||  || — || January 8, 2006 || Kitt Peak || Spacewatch ||  || align=right | 2.6 km || 
|-id=362 bgcolor=#d6d6d6
| 610362 ||  || — || August 28, 2014 || Haleakala || Pan-STARRS ||  || align=right | 2.5 km || 
|-id=363 bgcolor=#d6d6d6
| 610363 ||  || — || May 15, 2013 || Haleakala || Pan-STARRS ||  || align=right | 2.5 km || 
|-id=364 bgcolor=#d6d6d6
| 610364 ||  || — || January 4, 2006 || Kitt Peak || Spacewatch ||  || align=right | 1.8 km || 
|-id=365 bgcolor=#d6d6d6
| 610365 ||  || — || December 13, 2015 || Haleakala || Pan-STARRS ||  || align=right | 2.1 km || 
|-id=366 bgcolor=#d6d6d6
| 610366 ||  || — || September 30, 2009 || Mount Lemmon || Mount Lemmon Survey ||  || align=right | 2.2 km || 
|-id=367 bgcolor=#d6d6d6
| 610367 ||  || — || January 9, 2006 || Mount Lemmon || Mount Lemmon Survey ||  || align=right | 2.0 km || 
|-id=368 bgcolor=#d6d6d6
| 610368 ||  || — || August 22, 2014 || Haleakala || Pan-STARRS ||  || align=right | 2.3 km || 
|-id=369 bgcolor=#d6d6d6
| 610369 ||  || — || November 1, 2015 || Mount Lemmon || Mount Lemmon Survey ||  || align=right | 2.7 km || 
|-id=370 bgcolor=#fefefe
| 610370 ||  || — || January 4, 2006 || Kitt Peak || Spacewatch || H || align=right data-sort-value="0.42" | 420 m || 
|-id=371 bgcolor=#d6d6d6
| 610371 ||  || — || January 5, 2006 || Mount Lemmon || Mount Lemmon Survey ||  || align=right | 2.6 km || 
|-id=372 bgcolor=#E9E9E9
| 610372 ||  || — || January 7, 2006 || Kitt Peak || Spacewatch ||  || align=right data-sort-value="0.62" | 620 m || 
|-id=373 bgcolor=#d6d6d6
| 610373 ||  || — || January 7, 2006 || Mount Lemmon || Mount Lemmon Survey || 3:2 || align=right | 3.5 km || 
|-id=374 bgcolor=#d6d6d6
| 610374 ||  || — || January 10, 2006 || Kitt Peak || Spacewatch ||  || align=right | 1.6 km || 
|-id=375 bgcolor=#fefefe
| 610375 ||  || — || January 19, 2006 || Catalina || CSS || H || align=right data-sort-value="0.69" | 690 m || 
|-id=376 bgcolor=#d6d6d6
| 610376 ||  || — || December 25, 2005 || Kitt Peak || Spacewatch ||  || align=right | 2.9 km || 
|-id=377 bgcolor=#fefefe
| 610377 ||  || — || December 22, 2005 || Kitt Peak || Spacewatch ||  || align=right data-sort-value="0.59" | 590 m || 
|-id=378 bgcolor=#E9E9E9
| 610378 ||  || — || January 21, 2006 || Kitt Peak || Spacewatch ||  || align=right | 1.1 km || 
|-id=379 bgcolor=#fefefe
| 610379 ||  || — || January 7, 2006 || Mount Lemmon || Mount Lemmon Survey || H || align=right data-sort-value="0.59" | 590 m || 
|-id=380 bgcolor=#E9E9E9
| 610380 ||  || — || January 22, 2006 || Mount Lemmon || Mount Lemmon Survey ||  || align=right data-sort-value="0.85" | 850 m || 
|-id=381 bgcolor=#d6d6d6
| 610381 ||  || — || January 22, 2006 || Mount Lemmon || Mount Lemmon Survey ||  || align=right | 2.2 km || 
|-id=382 bgcolor=#d6d6d6
| 610382 ||  || — || January 22, 2006 || Mount Lemmon || Mount Lemmon Survey ||  || align=right | 2.2 km || 
|-id=383 bgcolor=#d6d6d6
| 610383 ||  || — || January 8, 2006 || Kitt Peak || Spacewatch ||  || align=right | 2.6 km || 
|-id=384 bgcolor=#d6d6d6
| 610384 ||  || — || December 5, 2005 || Mount Lemmon || Mount Lemmon Survey || 3:2 || align=right | 4.1 km || 
|-id=385 bgcolor=#d6d6d6
| 610385 ||  || — || January 23, 2006 || Kitt Peak || Spacewatch ||  || align=right | 2.7 km || 
|-id=386 bgcolor=#d6d6d6
| 610386 ||  || — || January 23, 2006 || Mount Lemmon || Mount Lemmon Survey ||  || align=right | 2.5 km || 
|-id=387 bgcolor=#d6d6d6
| 610387 ||  || — || January 10, 2006 || Mount Lemmon || Mount Lemmon Survey ||  || align=right | 1.6 km || 
|-id=388 bgcolor=#E9E9E9
| 610388 ||  || — || December 29, 2005 || Kitt Peak || Spacewatch ||  || align=right | 1.4 km || 
|-id=389 bgcolor=#fefefe
| 610389 ||  || — || January 23, 2006 || Catalina || CSS || H || align=right data-sort-value="0.62" | 620 m || 
|-id=390 bgcolor=#d6d6d6
| 610390 ||  || — || January 23, 2006 || Mount Lemmon || Mount Lemmon Survey ||  || align=right | 2.9 km || 
|-id=391 bgcolor=#d6d6d6
| 610391 ||  || — || January 25, 2006 || Kitt Peak || Spacewatch ||  || align=right | 2.5 km || 
|-id=392 bgcolor=#d6d6d6
| 610392 ||  || — || January 25, 2006 || Kitt Peak || Spacewatch ||  || align=right | 2.6 km || 
|-id=393 bgcolor=#E9E9E9
| 610393 ||  || — || January 25, 2006 || Kitt Peak || Spacewatch ||  || align=right data-sort-value="0.81" | 810 m || 
|-id=394 bgcolor=#d6d6d6
| 610394 ||  || — || January 8, 2006 || Mount Lemmon || Mount Lemmon Survey ||  || align=right | 2.5 km || 
|-id=395 bgcolor=#d6d6d6
| 610395 ||  || — || January 22, 2006 || Mount Lemmon || Mount Lemmon Survey ||  || align=right | 2.5 km || 
|-id=396 bgcolor=#d6d6d6
| 610396 ||  || — || January 6, 2006 || Kitt Peak || Spacewatch ||  || align=right | 2.5 km || 
|-id=397 bgcolor=#fefefe
| 610397 ||  || — || January 22, 2006 || Mount Lemmon || Mount Lemmon Survey ||  || align=right data-sort-value="0.58" | 580 m || 
|-id=398 bgcolor=#d6d6d6
| 610398 ||  || — || January 23, 2006 || Kitt Peak || Spacewatch ||  || align=right | 2.4 km || 
|-id=399 bgcolor=#E9E9E9
| 610399 ||  || — || January 23, 2006 || Kitt Peak || Spacewatch ||  || align=right data-sort-value="0.68" | 680 m || 
|-id=400 bgcolor=#E9E9E9
| 610400 ||  || — || January 23, 2006 || Kitt Peak || Spacewatch ||  || align=right data-sort-value="0.71" | 710 m || 
|}

610401–610500 

|-bgcolor=#d6d6d6
| 610401 ||  || — || January 23, 2006 || Kitt Peak || Spacewatch ||  || align=right | 2.2 km || 
|-id=402 bgcolor=#fefefe
| 610402 ||  || — || January 23, 2006 || Kitt Peak || Spacewatch || H || align=right data-sort-value="0.45" | 450 m || 
|-id=403 bgcolor=#d6d6d6
| 610403 ||  || — || January 23, 2006 || Mount Lemmon || Mount Lemmon Survey ||  || align=right | 2.1 km || 
|-id=404 bgcolor=#E9E9E9
| 610404 ||  || — || February 22, 2002 || Palomar || NEAT ||  || align=right | 1.3 km || 
|-id=405 bgcolor=#d6d6d6
| 610405 ||  || — || January 25, 2006 || Kitt Peak || Spacewatch ||  || align=right | 2.2 km || 
|-id=406 bgcolor=#E9E9E9
| 610406 ||  || — || January 25, 2006 || Kitt Peak || Spacewatch ||  || align=right data-sort-value="0.73" | 730 m || 
|-id=407 bgcolor=#d6d6d6
| 610407 ||  || — || January 26, 2006 || Catalina || CSS ||  || align=right | 2.4 km || 
|-id=408 bgcolor=#fefefe
| 610408 ||  || — || January 23, 2006 || Mount Lemmon || Mount Lemmon Survey ||  || align=right data-sort-value="0.58" | 580 m || 
|-id=409 bgcolor=#d6d6d6
| 610409 ||  || — || January 8, 2006 || Kitt Peak || Spacewatch ||  || align=right | 1.8 km || 
|-id=410 bgcolor=#E9E9E9
| 610410 ||  || — || January 25, 2006 || Kitt Peak || Spacewatch ||  || align=right | 1.6 km || 
|-id=411 bgcolor=#d6d6d6
| 610411 ||  || — || October 7, 2005 || Mauna Kea || Mauna Kea Obs. ||  || align=right | 2.9 km || 
|-id=412 bgcolor=#d6d6d6
| 610412 ||  || — || January 26, 2006 || Kitt Peak || Spacewatch ||  || align=right | 2.7 km || 
|-id=413 bgcolor=#d6d6d6
| 610413 ||  || — || January 26, 2006 || Kitt Peak || Spacewatch ||  || align=right | 2.8 km || 
|-id=414 bgcolor=#fefefe
| 610414 ||  || — || January 26, 2006 || Kitt Peak || Spacewatch ||  || align=right data-sort-value="0.62" | 620 m || 
|-id=415 bgcolor=#fefefe
| 610415 ||  || — || January 26, 2006 || Mount Lemmon || Mount Lemmon Survey ||  || align=right data-sort-value="0.47" | 470 m || 
|-id=416 bgcolor=#d6d6d6
| 610416 ||  || — || January 26, 2006 || Mount Lemmon || Mount Lemmon Survey ||  || align=right | 3.2 km || 
|-id=417 bgcolor=#E9E9E9
| 610417 ||  || — || March 21, 1998 || Kitt Peak || Spacewatch ||  || align=right | 1.1 km || 
|-id=418 bgcolor=#d6d6d6
| 610418 ||  || — || December 2, 2005 || Kitt Peak || L. H. Wasserman, R. Millis ||  || align=right | 1.9 km || 
|-id=419 bgcolor=#d6d6d6
| 610419 ||  || — || January 26, 2006 || Mount Lemmon || Mount Lemmon Survey ||  || align=right | 3.0 km || 
|-id=420 bgcolor=#d6d6d6
| 610420 ||  || — || January 26, 2006 || Kitt Peak || Spacewatch ||  || align=right | 2.4 km || 
|-id=421 bgcolor=#d6d6d6
| 610421 ||  || — || January 25, 2006 || Kitt Peak || Spacewatch ||  || align=right | 2.5 km || 
|-id=422 bgcolor=#d6d6d6
| 610422 ||  || — || January 28, 2006 || Mount Lemmon || Mount Lemmon Survey ||  || align=right | 3.2 km || 
|-id=423 bgcolor=#d6d6d6
| 610423 ||  || — || January 28, 2006 || Mount Lemmon || Mount Lemmon Survey ||  || align=right | 2.4 km || 
|-id=424 bgcolor=#d6d6d6
| 610424 ||  || — || January 28, 2006 || Mount Lemmon || Mount Lemmon Survey ||  || align=right | 1.8 km || 
|-id=425 bgcolor=#d6d6d6
| 610425 ||  || — || January 9, 2006 || Mount Lemmon || Mount Lemmon Survey ||  || align=right | 1.8 km || 
|-id=426 bgcolor=#d6d6d6
| 610426 ||  || — || January 27, 2006 || Kitt Peak || Spacewatch ||  || align=right | 3.0 km || 
|-id=427 bgcolor=#d6d6d6
| 610427 ||  || — || January 28, 2006 || Mount Lemmon || Mount Lemmon Survey ||  || align=right | 2.7 km || 
|-id=428 bgcolor=#fefefe
| 610428 ||  || — || January 24, 2006 || Socorro || LINEAR || H || align=right data-sort-value="0.73" | 730 m || 
|-id=429 bgcolor=#d6d6d6
| 610429 ||  || — || January 23, 2006 || Catalina || CSS ||  || align=right | 3.1 km || 
|-id=430 bgcolor=#E9E9E9
| 610430 ||  || — || January 25, 2006 || Mount Lemmon || Mount Lemmon Survey ||  || align=right data-sort-value="0.86" | 860 m || 
|-id=431 bgcolor=#E9E9E9
| 610431 ||  || — || January 25, 2006 || Kitt Peak || Spacewatch ||  || align=right data-sort-value="0.79" | 790 m || 
|-id=432 bgcolor=#fefefe
| 610432 ||  || — || January 26, 2006 || Kitt Peak || Spacewatch ||  || align=right data-sort-value="0.53" | 530 m || 
|-id=433 bgcolor=#d6d6d6
| 610433 ||  || — || January 26, 2006 || Kitt Peak || Spacewatch ||  || align=right | 2.1 km || 
|-id=434 bgcolor=#d6d6d6
| 610434 ||  || — || January 26, 2006 || Kitt Peak || Spacewatch ||  || align=right | 3.0 km || 
|-id=435 bgcolor=#d6d6d6
| 610435 ||  || — || January 26, 2006 || Kitt Peak || Spacewatch ||  || align=right | 2.3 km || 
|-id=436 bgcolor=#E9E9E9
| 610436 ||  || — || January 26, 2006 || Kitt Peak || Spacewatch ||  || align=right | 1.1 km || 
|-id=437 bgcolor=#d6d6d6
| 610437 ||  || — || January 26, 2006 || Mount Lemmon || Mount Lemmon Survey ||  || align=right | 3.1 km || 
|-id=438 bgcolor=#d6d6d6
| 610438 ||  || — || January 27, 2006 || Kitt Peak || Spacewatch ||  || align=right | 2.5 km || 
|-id=439 bgcolor=#d6d6d6
| 610439 ||  || — || January 27, 2006 || Kitt Peak || Spacewatch ||  || align=right | 2.1 km || 
|-id=440 bgcolor=#d6d6d6
| 610440 ||  || — || December 25, 2005 || Mount Lemmon || Mount Lemmon Survey ||  || align=right | 2.3 km || 
|-id=441 bgcolor=#E9E9E9
| 610441 ||  || — || January 7, 2006 || Mount Lemmon || Mount Lemmon Survey ||  || align=right data-sort-value="0.70" | 700 m || 
|-id=442 bgcolor=#d6d6d6
| 610442 ||  || — || January 27, 2006 || Mount Lemmon || Mount Lemmon Survey ||  || align=right | 3.2 km || 
|-id=443 bgcolor=#d6d6d6
| 610443 ||  || — || January 27, 2006 || Mount Lemmon || Mount Lemmon Survey ||  || align=right | 2.3 km || 
|-id=444 bgcolor=#E9E9E9
| 610444 ||  || — || January 27, 2006 || Mount Lemmon || Mount Lemmon Survey ||  || align=right | 1.2 km || 
|-id=445 bgcolor=#fefefe
| 610445 ||  || — || January 27, 2006 || Mount Lemmon || Mount Lemmon Survey ||  || align=right data-sort-value="0.49" | 490 m || 
|-id=446 bgcolor=#d6d6d6
| 610446 ||  || — || January 27, 2006 || Mount Lemmon || Mount Lemmon Survey ||  || align=right | 2.9 km || 
|-id=447 bgcolor=#d6d6d6
| 610447 ||  || — || January 27, 2006 || Mount Lemmon || Mount Lemmon Survey ||  || align=right | 3.1 km || 
|-id=448 bgcolor=#E9E9E9
| 610448 ||  || — || January 28, 2006 || Mount Lemmon || Mount Lemmon Survey ||  || align=right | 1.1 km || 
|-id=449 bgcolor=#d6d6d6
| 610449 ||  || — || January 28, 2006 || Kitt Peak || Spacewatch ||  || align=right | 2.6 km || 
|-id=450 bgcolor=#d6d6d6
| 610450 ||  || — || January 30, 2006 || Kitt Peak || Spacewatch ||  || align=right | 2.7 km || 
|-id=451 bgcolor=#E9E9E9
| 610451 ||  || — || January 30, 2006 || Kitt Peak || Spacewatch ||  || align=right data-sort-value="0.91" | 910 m || 
|-id=452 bgcolor=#d6d6d6
| 610452 ||  || — || January 30, 2006 || Kitt Peak || Spacewatch ||  || align=right | 2.5 km || 
|-id=453 bgcolor=#E9E9E9
| 610453 ||  || — || January 30, 2006 || Kitt Peak || Spacewatch ||  || align=right | 1.3 km || 
|-id=454 bgcolor=#E9E9E9
| 610454 ||  || — || February 23, 2015 || Haleakala || Pan-STARRS ||  || align=right | 1.1 km || 
|-id=455 bgcolor=#E9E9E9
| 610455 ||  || — || January 31, 2006 || Kitt Peak || Spacewatch ||  || align=right | 1.4 km || 
|-id=456 bgcolor=#d6d6d6
| 610456 ||  || — || January 31, 2006 || Kitt Peak || Spacewatch ||  || align=right | 2.3 km || 
|-id=457 bgcolor=#d6d6d6
| 610457 ||  || — || October 24, 2005 || Mauna Kea || Mauna Kea Obs. ||  || align=right | 2.9 km || 
|-id=458 bgcolor=#d6d6d6
| 610458 ||  || — || January 31, 2006 || Kitt Peak || Spacewatch ||  || align=right | 2.3 km || 
|-id=459 bgcolor=#d6d6d6
| 610459 ||  || — || July 25, 2014 || Haleakala || Pan-STARRS ||  || align=right | 2.1 km || 
|-id=460 bgcolor=#d6d6d6
| 610460 ||  || — || January 9, 2006 || Kitt Peak || Spacewatch ||  || align=right | 2.1 km || 
|-id=461 bgcolor=#d6d6d6
| 610461 ||  || — || January 31, 2006 || Mount Lemmon || Mount Lemmon Survey ||  || align=right | 2.3 km || 
|-id=462 bgcolor=#fefefe
| 610462 ||  || — || January 31, 2006 || Mount Lemmon || Mount Lemmon Survey ||  || align=right data-sort-value="0.53" | 530 m || 
|-id=463 bgcolor=#d6d6d6
| 610463 ||  || — || January 26, 2006 || Kitt Peak || Spacewatch ||  || align=right | 2.6 km || 
|-id=464 bgcolor=#d6d6d6
| 610464 ||  || — || January 31, 2006 || Kitt Peak || Spacewatch ||  || align=right | 2.9 km || 
|-id=465 bgcolor=#d6d6d6
| 610465 ||  || — || January 28, 2006 || Mount Lemmon || Mount Lemmon Survey ||  || align=right | 2.0 km || 
|-id=466 bgcolor=#d6d6d6
| 610466 ||  || — || January 8, 2006 || Kitt Peak || Spacewatch ||  || align=right | 3.2 km || 
|-id=467 bgcolor=#d6d6d6
| 610467 ||  || — || January 30, 2006 || Kitt Peak || Spacewatch ||  || align=right | 2.0 km || 
|-id=468 bgcolor=#E9E9E9
| 610468 ||  || — || January 30, 2006 || Kitt Peak || Spacewatch ||  || align=right data-sort-value="0.81" | 810 m || 
|-id=469 bgcolor=#d6d6d6
| 610469 ||  || — || November 7, 2005 || Mauna Kea || Mauna Kea Obs. ||  || align=right | 2.1 km || 
|-id=470 bgcolor=#fefefe
| 610470 ||  || — || January 31, 2006 || Kitt Peak || Spacewatch ||  || align=right data-sort-value="0.52" | 520 m || 
|-id=471 bgcolor=#d6d6d6
| 610471 ||  || — || January 23, 2006 || Kitt Peak || Spacewatch || EOS || align=right | 1.9 km || 
|-id=472 bgcolor=#E9E9E9
| 610472 ||  || — || January 31, 2006 || Kitt Peak || Spacewatch ||  || align=right data-sort-value="0.80" | 800 m || 
|-id=473 bgcolor=#d6d6d6
| 610473 ||  || — || January 23, 2006 || Mount Lemmon || Mount Lemmon Survey ||  || align=right | 2.8 km || 
|-id=474 bgcolor=#fefefe
| 610474 ||  || — || January 31, 2006 || Kitt Peak || Spacewatch ||  || align=right data-sort-value="0.69" | 690 m || 
|-id=475 bgcolor=#d6d6d6
| 610475 ||  || — || January 31, 2006 || Kitt Peak || Spacewatch ||  || align=right | 2.2 km || 
|-id=476 bgcolor=#E9E9E9
| 610476 ||  || — || January 4, 2006 || Kitt Peak || Spacewatch ||  || align=right data-sort-value="0.64" | 640 m || 
|-id=477 bgcolor=#d6d6d6
| 610477 ||  || — || January 31, 2006 || Kitt Peak || Spacewatch ||  || align=right | 2.4 km || 
|-id=478 bgcolor=#d6d6d6
| 610478 ||  || — || January 31, 2006 || Kitt Peak || Spacewatch ||  || align=right | 2.0 km || 
|-id=479 bgcolor=#d6d6d6
| 610479 ||  || — || October 24, 2005 || Mauna Kea || Mauna Kea Obs. ||  || align=right | 3.1 km || 
|-id=480 bgcolor=#E9E9E9
| 610480 ||  || — || January 31, 2006 || Kitt Peak || Spacewatch ||  || align=right | 1.0 km || 
|-id=481 bgcolor=#E9E9E9
| 610481 ||  || — || January 31, 2006 || Kitt Peak || Spacewatch ||  || align=right data-sort-value="0.83" | 830 m || 
|-id=482 bgcolor=#E9E9E9
| 610482 ||  || — || January 31, 2006 || Kitt Peak || Spacewatch ||  || align=right | 1.2 km || 
|-id=483 bgcolor=#d6d6d6
| 610483 ||  || — || January 31, 2006 || Kitt Peak || Spacewatch ||  || align=right | 2.5 km || 
|-id=484 bgcolor=#d6d6d6
| 610484 ||  || — || October 24, 2005 || Mauna Kea || Mauna Kea Obs. || VER || align=right | 2.3 km || 
|-id=485 bgcolor=#d6d6d6
| 610485 ||  || — || January 31, 2006 || Kitt Peak || Spacewatch ||  || align=right | 2.9 km || 
|-id=486 bgcolor=#d6d6d6
| 610486 ||  || — || January 31, 2006 || Kitt Peak || Spacewatch ||  || align=right | 2.5 km || 
|-id=487 bgcolor=#d6d6d6
| 610487 ||  || — || October 24, 2005 || Mauna Kea || Mauna Kea Obs. ||  || align=right | 1.9 km || 
|-id=488 bgcolor=#d6d6d6
| 610488 ||  || — || January 31, 2006 || Kitt Peak || Spacewatch ||  || align=right | 3.7 km || 
|-id=489 bgcolor=#d6d6d6
| 610489 ||  || — || January 31, 2006 || Kitt Peak || Spacewatch ||  || align=right | 2.6 km || 
|-id=490 bgcolor=#d6d6d6
| 610490 ||  || — || January 31, 2006 || Kitt Peak || Spacewatch ||  || align=right | 3.4 km || 
|-id=491 bgcolor=#E9E9E9
| 610491 ||  || — || January 31, 2006 || Kitt Peak || Spacewatch ||  || align=right | 1.1 km || 
|-id=492 bgcolor=#d6d6d6
| 610492 ||  || — || January 31, 2006 || Kitt Peak || Spacewatch ||  || align=right | 2.5 km || 
|-id=493 bgcolor=#fefefe
| 610493 ||  || — || January 31, 2006 || Kitt Peak || Spacewatch ||  || align=right data-sort-value="0.61" | 610 m || 
|-id=494 bgcolor=#d6d6d6
| 610494 ||  || — || January 27, 2006 || Mount Lemmon || Mount Lemmon Survey ||  || align=right | 2.6 km || 
|-id=495 bgcolor=#d6d6d6
| 610495 ||  || — || January 30, 2006 || Catalina || CSS ||  || align=right | 3.3 km || 
|-id=496 bgcolor=#d6d6d6
| 610496 ||  || — || January 7, 2006 || Mount Lemmon || Mount Lemmon Survey ||  || align=right | 3.4 km || 
|-id=497 bgcolor=#E9E9E9
| 610497 ||  || — || January 30, 2006 || Kitt Peak || Spacewatch ||  || align=right | 1.6 km || 
|-id=498 bgcolor=#d6d6d6
| 610498 ||  || — || January 30, 2006 || Kitt Peak || Spacewatch || THM || align=right | 1.8 km || 
|-id=499 bgcolor=#d6d6d6
| 610499 ||  || — || January 23, 2006 || Kitt Peak || Spacewatch ||  || align=right | 2.9 km || 
|-id=500 bgcolor=#d6d6d6
| 610500 ||  || — || December 23, 2000 || Apache Point || SDSS Collaboration ||  || align=right | 3.0 km || 
|}

610501–610600 

|-bgcolor=#E9E9E9
| 610501 ||  || — || December 30, 2005 || Kitt Peak || Spacewatch ||  || align=right data-sort-value="0.74" | 740 m || 
|-id=502 bgcolor=#fefefe
| 610502 ||  || — || January 23, 2006 || Kitt Peak || Spacewatch ||  || align=right data-sort-value="0.74" | 740 m || 
|-id=503 bgcolor=#E9E9E9
| 610503 ||  || — || May 7, 2011 || Kitt Peak || Spacewatch ||  || align=right data-sort-value="0.85" | 850 m || 
|-id=504 bgcolor=#E9E9E9
| 610504 ||  || — || January 30, 2006 || Kitt Peak || Spacewatch ||  || align=right data-sort-value="0.86" | 860 m || 
|-id=505 bgcolor=#E9E9E9
| 610505 ||  || — || January 6, 2010 || Kitt Peak || Spacewatch ||  || align=right data-sort-value="0.85" | 850 m || 
|-id=506 bgcolor=#d6d6d6
| 610506 ||  || — || May 15, 2013 || Haleakala || Pan-STARRS ||  || align=right | 2.4 km || 
|-id=507 bgcolor=#fefefe
| 610507 ||  || — || January 31, 2006 || Kitt Peak || Spacewatch ||  || align=right data-sort-value="0.52" | 520 m || 
|-id=508 bgcolor=#d6d6d6
| 610508 ||  || — || January 31, 2006 || Kitt Peak || Spacewatch ||  || align=right | 2.5 km || 
|-id=509 bgcolor=#d6d6d6
| 610509 ||  || — || January 7, 2006 || Mount Lemmon || Mount Lemmon Survey ||  || align=right | 4.3 km || 
|-id=510 bgcolor=#d6d6d6
| 610510 ||  || — || December 3, 2015 || Haleakala || Pan-STARRS ||  || align=right | 2.5 km || 
|-id=511 bgcolor=#E9E9E9
| 610511 ||  || — || January 31, 2006 || Mount Lemmon || Mount Lemmon Survey ||  || align=right | 1.0 km || 
|-id=512 bgcolor=#d6d6d6
| 610512 ||  || — || September 18, 2014 || Haleakala || Pan-STARRS ||  || align=right | 2.6 km || 
|-id=513 bgcolor=#d6d6d6
| 610513 ||  || — || January 27, 2006 || Mount Lemmon || Mount Lemmon Survey ||  || align=right | 2.8 km || 
|-id=514 bgcolor=#d6d6d6
| 610514 ||  || — || January 23, 2006 || Kitt Peak || Spacewatch ||  || align=right | 2.2 km || 
|-id=515 bgcolor=#d6d6d6
| 610515 ||  || — || January 26, 2006 || Kitt Peak || Spacewatch ||  || align=right | 3.0 km || 
|-id=516 bgcolor=#d6d6d6
| 610516 ||  || — || January 12, 2011 || Mount Lemmon || Mount Lemmon Survey ||  || align=right | 2.7 km || 
|-id=517 bgcolor=#E9E9E9
| 610517 ||  || — || October 24, 2008 || Kitt Peak || Spacewatch ||  || align=right data-sort-value="0.73" | 730 m || 
|-id=518 bgcolor=#d6d6d6
| 610518 ||  || — || July 31, 2014 || Haleakala || Pan-STARRS ||  || align=right | 2.6 km || 
|-id=519 bgcolor=#d6d6d6
| 610519 ||  || — || July 25, 2008 || Mount Lemmon || Mount Lemmon Survey ||  || align=right | 3.5 km || 
|-id=520 bgcolor=#E9E9E9
| 610520 ||  || — || January 31, 2006 || Mount Lemmon || Mount Lemmon Survey ||  || align=right data-sort-value="0.82" | 820 m || 
|-id=521 bgcolor=#fefefe
| 610521 ||  || — || November 20, 2008 || Mount Lemmon || Mount Lemmon Survey ||  || align=right data-sort-value="0.58" | 580 m || 
|-id=522 bgcolor=#E9E9E9
| 610522 ||  || — || December 27, 2005 || Kitt Peak || Spacewatch ||  || align=right data-sort-value="0.96" | 960 m || 
|-id=523 bgcolor=#E9E9E9
| 610523 ||  || — || October 9, 2008 || Mount Lemmon || Mount Lemmon Survey ||  || align=right data-sort-value="0.79" | 790 m || 
|-id=524 bgcolor=#E9E9E9
| 610524 ||  || — || January 23, 2006 || Kitt Peak || Spacewatch ||  || align=right data-sort-value="0.80" | 800 m || 
|-id=525 bgcolor=#d6d6d6
| 610525 ||  || — || October 1, 2014 || Haleakala || Pan-STARRS ||  || align=right | 2.5 km || 
|-id=526 bgcolor=#E9E9E9
| 610526 ||  || — || February 28, 2014 || Haleakala || Pan-STARRS ||  || align=right data-sort-value="0.75" | 750 m || 
|-id=527 bgcolor=#d6d6d6
| 610527 ||  || — || October 1, 2014 || Haleakala || Pan-STARRS ||  || align=right | 2.9 km || 
|-id=528 bgcolor=#E9E9E9
| 610528 ||  || — || January 31, 2006 || Kitt Peak || Spacewatch ||  || align=right data-sort-value="0.99" | 990 m || 
|-id=529 bgcolor=#d6d6d6
| 610529 ||  || — || January 22, 2006 || Mount Lemmon || Mount Lemmon Survey ||  || align=right | 2.5 km || 
|-id=530 bgcolor=#fefefe
| 610530 ||  || — || January 23, 2006 || Kitt Peak || Spacewatch ||  || align=right data-sort-value="0.50" | 500 m || 
|-id=531 bgcolor=#d6d6d6
| 610531 ||  || — || January 23, 2006 || Mount Lemmon || Mount Lemmon Survey ||  || align=right | 2.5 km || 
|-id=532 bgcolor=#d6d6d6
| 610532 ||  || — || January 26, 2017 || Mount Lemmon || Mount Lemmon Survey ||  || align=right | 2.0 km || 
|-id=533 bgcolor=#d6d6d6
| 610533 ||  || — || May 21, 2018 || Haleakala || Pan-STARRS ||  || align=right | 2.0 km || 
|-id=534 bgcolor=#d6d6d6
| 610534 ||  || — || January 13, 2011 || Mount Lemmon || Mount Lemmon Survey ||  || align=right | 2.1 km || 
|-id=535 bgcolor=#d6d6d6
| 610535 ||  || — || January 26, 2017 || Mount Lemmon || Mount Lemmon Survey ||  || align=right | 2.4 km || 
|-id=536 bgcolor=#E9E9E9
| 610536 ||  || — || July 14, 2016 || Mount Lemmon || Mount Lemmon Survey ||  || align=right data-sort-value="0.83" | 830 m || 
|-id=537 bgcolor=#E9E9E9
| 610537 ||  || — || January 23, 2006 || Kitt Peak || Spacewatch ||  || align=right | 1.2 km || 
|-id=538 bgcolor=#d6d6d6
| 610538 ||  || — || January 28, 2006 || Mount Lemmon || Mount Lemmon Survey ||  || align=right | 2.2 km || 
|-id=539 bgcolor=#d6d6d6
| 610539 ||  || — || January 31, 2006 || Kitt Peak || Spacewatch ||  || align=right | 2.6 km || 
|-id=540 bgcolor=#d6d6d6
| 610540 ||  || — || January 27, 2006 || Kitt Peak || Spacewatch ||  || align=right | 2.1 km || 
|-id=541 bgcolor=#E9E9E9
| 610541 ||  || — || January 27, 2006 || Kitt Peak || Spacewatch ||  || align=right data-sort-value="0.67" | 670 m || 
|-id=542 bgcolor=#E9E9E9
| 610542 ||  || — || January 31, 2006 || Kitt Peak || Spacewatch ||  || align=right data-sort-value="0.82" | 820 m || 
|-id=543 bgcolor=#d6d6d6
| 610543 ||  || — || January 23, 2006 || Mount Lemmon || Mount Lemmon Survey ||  || align=right | 2.0 km || 
|-id=544 bgcolor=#d6d6d6
| 610544 ||  || — || January 27, 2006 || Kitt Peak || Spacewatch ||  || align=right | 2.5 km || 
|-id=545 bgcolor=#d6d6d6
| 610545 ||  || — || January 23, 2006 || Mount Lemmon || Mount Lemmon Survey ||  || align=right | 2.2 km || 
|-id=546 bgcolor=#E9E9E9
| 610546 ||  || — || February 1, 2006 || Mount Lemmon || Mount Lemmon Survey ||  || align=right | 1.1 km || 
|-id=547 bgcolor=#d6d6d6
| 610547 ||  || — || January 27, 2006 || Kitt Peak || Spacewatch ||  || align=right | 2.9 km || 
|-id=548 bgcolor=#d6d6d6
| 610548 ||  || — || February 1, 2006 || Mount Lemmon || Mount Lemmon Survey ||  || align=right | 2.5 km || 
|-id=549 bgcolor=#fefefe
| 610549 ||  || — || July 16, 2004 || Cerro Tololo || Cerro Tololo Obs. ||  || align=right data-sort-value="0.59" | 590 m || 
|-id=550 bgcolor=#fefefe
| 610550 ||  || — || November 7, 2005 || Mauna Kea || Mauna Kea Obs. ||  || align=right data-sort-value="0.65" | 650 m || 
|-id=551 bgcolor=#E9E9E9
| 610551 ||  || — || February 1, 2006 || Kitt Peak || Spacewatch ||  || align=right data-sort-value="0.80" | 800 m || 
|-id=552 bgcolor=#d6d6d6
| 610552 ||  || — || February 1, 2006 || Kitt Peak || Spacewatch ||  || align=right | 2.4 km || 
|-id=553 bgcolor=#d6d6d6
| 610553 ||  || — || January 23, 2006 || Kitt Peak || Spacewatch ||  || align=right | 3.0 km || 
|-id=554 bgcolor=#E9E9E9
| 610554 ||  || — || February 1, 2006 || Kitt Peak || Spacewatch ||  || align=right | 1.1 km || 
|-id=555 bgcolor=#d6d6d6
| 610555 ||  || — || February 1, 2006 || Mount Lemmon || Mount Lemmon Survey ||  || align=right | 2.5 km || 
|-id=556 bgcolor=#d6d6d6
| 610556 ||  || — || February 1, 2006 || Kitt Peak || Spacewatch ||  || align=right | 3.4 km || 
|-id=557 bgcolor=#d6d6d6
| 610557 ||  || — || February 2, 2006 || Kitt Peak || Spacewatch ||  || align=right | 2.2 km || 
|-id=558 bgcolor=#E9E9E9
| 610558 ||  || — || January 22, 2006 || Mount Lemmon || Mount Lemmon Survey ||  || align=right data-sort-value="0.77" | 770 m || 
|-id=559 bgcolor=#E9E9E9
| 610559 ||  || — || February 7, 2002 || Kitt Peak || Spacewatch ||  || align=right data-sort-value="0.71" | 710 m || 
|-id=560 bgcolor=#d6d6d6
| 610560 ||  || — || January 22, 2006 || Mount Lemmon || Mount Lemmon Survey ||  || align=right | 2.3 km || 
|-id=561 bgcolor=#fefefe
| 610561 ||  || — || February 2, 2006 || Kitt Peak || Spacewatch ||  || align=right data-sort-value="0.57" | 570 m || 
|-id=562 bgcolor=#d6d6d6
| 610562 ||  || — || February 2, 2006 || Kitt Peak || Spacewatch ||  || align=right | 3.0 km || 
|-id=563 bgcolor=#E9E9E9
| 610563 ||  || — || March 6, 1994 || Kitt Peak || Spacewatch ||  || align=right | 1.0 km || 
|-id=564 bgcolor=#d6d6d6
| 610564 ||  || — || January 23, 2006 || Mount Lemmon || Mount Lemmon Survey ||  || align=right | 2.5 km || 
|-id=565 bgcolor=#d6d6d6
| 610565 ||  || — || February 2, 2006 || Kitt Peak || Spacewatch ||  || align=right | 2.4 km || 
|-id=566 bgcolor=#d6d6d6
| 610566 ||  || — || February 2, 2006 || Kitt Peak || Spacewatch ||  || align=right | 2.4 km || 
|-id=567 bgcolor=#d6d6d6
| 610567 ||  || — || February 2, 2006 || Kitt Peak || Spacewatch ||  || align=right | 2.3 km || 
|-id=568 bgcolor=#d6d6d6
| 610568 ||  || — || January 26, 2006 || Kitt Peak || Spacewatch ||  || align=right | 3.1 km || 
|-id=569 bgcolor=#d6d6d6
| 610569 ||  || — || February 2, 2006 || Kitt Peak || Spacewatch ||  || align=right | 2.4 km || 
|-id=570 bgcolor=#d6d6d6
| 610570 ||  || — || February 2, 2006 || Kitt Peak || Spacewatch ||  || align=right | 2.2 km || 
|-id=571 bgcolor=#fefefe
| 610571 ||  || — || February 2, 2006 || Kitt Peak || Spacewatch || H || align=right data-sort-value="0.56" | 560 m || 
|-id=572 bgcolor=#d6d6d6
| 610572 ||  || — || January 26, 2006 || Catalina || CSS ||  || align=right | 3.1 km || 
|-id=573 bgcolor=#d6d6d6
| 610573 ||  || — || February 7, 2006 || Kitt Peak || Spacewatch ||  || align=right | 2.0 km || 
|-id=574 bgcolor=#E9E9E9
| 610574 ||  || — || February 6, 2006 || Mount Lemmon || Mount Lemmon Survey ||  || align=right data-sort-value="0.91" | 910 m || 
|-id=575 bgcolor=#d6d6d6
| 610575 ||  || — || February 3, 2006 || Mount Lemmon || Mount Lemmon Survey ||  || align=right | 2.4 km || 
|-id=576 bgcolor=#fefefe
| 610576 ||  || — || August 13, 2004 || Cerro Tololo || Cerro Tololo Obs. ||  || align=right data-sort-value="0.63" | 630 m || 
|-id=577 bgcolor=#d6d6d6
| 610577 ||  || — || January 22, 2006 || Mount Lemmon || Mount Lemmon Survey ||  || align=right | 2.2 km || 
|-id=578 bgcolor=#E9E9E9
| 610578 ||  || — || February 4, 2006 || Mount Lemmon || Mount Lemmon Survey ||  || align=right data-sort-value="0.89" | 890 m || 
|-id=579 bgcolor=#d6d6d6
| 610579 ||  || — || January 22, 2006 || Mount Lemmon || Mount Lemmon Survey ||  || align=right | 2.6 km || 
|-id=580 bgcolor=#fefefe
| 610580 ||  || — || January 30, 2006 || Kitt Peak || Spacewatch ||  || align=right data-sort-value="0.52" | 520 m || 
|-id=581 bgcolor=#d6d6d6
| 610581 ||  || — || February 2, 2006 || Mauna Kea || Mauna Kea Obs. ||  || align=right | 2.6 km || 
|-id=582 bgcolor=#fefefe
| 610582 ||  || — || December 5, 2005 || Kitt Peak || Spacewatch ||  || align=right data-sort-value="0.65" | 650 m || 
|-id=583 bgcolor=#d6d6d6
| 610583 ||  || — || November 25, 2005 || Mount Lemmon || Mount Lemmon Survey ||  || align=right | 2.3 km || 
|-id=584 bgcolor=#d6d6d6
| 610584 ||  || — || January 4, 2011 || Mount Lemmon || Mount Lemmon Survey ||  || align=right | 2.7 km || 
|-id=585 bgcolor=#E9E9E9
| 610585 ||  || — || September 19, 2012 || Mount Lemmon || Mount Lemmon Survey ||  || align=right data-sort-value="0.71" | 710 m || 
|-id=586 bgcolor=#E9E9E9
| 610586 ||  || — || February 1, 2006 || Kitt Peak || Spacewatch ||  || align=right data-sort-value="0.85" | 850 m || 
|-id=587 bgcolor=#d6d6d6
| 610587 ||  || — || February 1, 2006 || Kitt Peak || Spacewatch ||  || align=right | 2.9 km || 
|-id=588 bgcolor=#d6d6d6
| 610588 ||  || — || December 7, 2015 || Haleakala || Pan-STARRS ||  || align=right | 3.3 km || 
|-id=589 bgcolor=#E9E9E9
| 610589 ||  || — || February 1, 2006 || Kitt Peak || Spacewatch ||  || align=right data-sort-value="0.74" | 740 m || 
|-id=590 bgcolor=#d6d6d6
| 610590 ||  || — || February 1, 2012 || Mount Lemmon || Mount Lemmon Survey ||  || align=right | 2.4 km || 
|-id=591 bgcolor=#d6d6d6
| 610591 ||  || — || December 10, 2010 || Mount Lemmon || Mount Lemmon Survey ||  || align=right | 2.3 km || 
|-id=592 bgcolor=#d6d6d6
| 610592 ||  || — || February 4, 2006 || Kitt Peak || Spacewatch ||  || align=right | 2.5 km || 
|-id=593 bgcolor=#d6d6d6
| 610593 ||  || — || November 7, 2010 || Mount Lemmon || Mount Lemmon Survey ||  || align=right | 2.5 km || 
|-id=594 bgcolor=#d6d6d6
| 610594 ||  || — || February 1, 2006 || Kitt Peak || Spacewatch ||  || align=right | 2.1 km || 
|-id=595 bgcolor=#E9E9E9
| 610595 ||  || — || May 24, 2011 || Haleakala || Pan-STARRS ||  || align=right | 1.2 km || 
|-id=596 bgcolor=#fefefe
| 610596 ||  || — || March 18, 2013 || Mount Lemmon || Mount Lemmon Survey ||  || align=right data-sort-value="0.61" | 610 m || 
|-id=597 bgcolor=#E9E9E9
| 610597 ||  || — || July 5, 2016 || Haleakala || Pan-STARRS ||  || align=right data-sort-value="0.73" | 730 m || 
|-id=598 bgcolor=#d6d6d6
| 610598 ||  || — || January 30, 2017 || Haleakala || Pan-STARRS ||  || align=right | 2.7 km || 
|-id=599 bgcolor=#E9E9E9
| 610599 ||  || — || February 1, 2006 || Kitt Peak || Spacewatch ||  || align=right data-sort-value="0.81" | 810 m || 
|-id=600 bgcolor=#d6d6d6
| 610600 ||  || — || June 10, 2007 || Kitt Peak || Spacewatch ||  || align=right | 2.7 km || 
|}

610601–610700 

|-bgcolor=#d6d6d6
| 610601 ||  || — || December 8, 2010 || Mount Lemmon || Mount Lemmon Survey ||  || align=right | 2.4 km || 
|-id=602 bgcolor=#E9E9E9
| 610602 ||  || — || September 18, 2012 || Mount Lemmon || Mount Lemmon Survey ||  || align=right data-sort-value="0.75" | 750 m || 
|-id=603 bgcolor=#d6d6d6
| 610603 ||  || — || February 21, 2006 || Mount Lemmon || Mount Lemmon Survey ||  || align=right | 2.9 km || 
|-id=604 bgcolor=#E9E9E9
| 610604 ||  || — || February 21, 2006 || Catalina || CSS ||  || align=right | 1.2 km || 
|-id=605 bgcolor=#d6d6d6
| 610605 ||  || — || February 20, 2006 || Mount Lemmon || Mount Lemmon Survey ||  || align=right | 2.8 km || 
|-id=606 bgcolor=#E9E9E9
| 610606 ||  || — || January 31, 2006 || Kitt Peak || Spacewatch ||  || align=right data-sort-value="0.85" | 850 m || 
|-id=607 bgcolor=#d6d6d6
| 610607 ||  || — || February 20, 2006 || Kitt Peak || Spacewatch ||  || align=right | 2.8 km || 
|-id=608 bgcolor=#fefefe
| 610608 ||  || — || February 20, 2006 || Kitt Peak || Spacewatch ||  || align=right data-sort-value="0.60" | 600 m || 
|-id=609 bgcolor=#E9E9E9
| 610609 ||  || — || February 20, 2006 || Kitt Peak || Spacewatch ||  || align=right | 1.9 km || 
|-id=610 bgcolor=#d6d6d6
| 610610 ||  || — || February 20, 2006 || Kitt Peak || Spacewatch ||  || align=right | 3.1 km || 
|-id=611 bgcolor=#d6d6d6
| 610611 ||  || — || February 20, 2006 || Kitt Peak || Spacewatch ||  || align=right | 2.2 km || 
|-id=612 bgcolor=#E9E9E9
| 610612 ||  || — || February 20, 2006 || Kitt Peak || Spacewatch ||  || align=right | 1.0 km || 
|-id=613 bgcolor=#E9E9E9
| 610613 ||  || — || February 21, 2006 || Catalina || CSS ||  || align=right data-sort-value="0.81" | 810 m || 
|-id=614 bgcolor=#E9E9E9
| 610614 ||  || — || February 24, 2006 || Catalina || CSS ||  || align=right | 1.2 km || 
|-id=615 bgcolor=#E9E9E9
| 610615 ||  || — || February 24, 2006 || Mount Lemmon || Mount Lemmon Survey ||  || align=right data-sort-value="0.67" | 670 m || 
|-id=616 bgcolor=#E9E9E9
| 610616 ||  || — || February 21, 2006 || Mount Lemmon || Mount Lemmon Survey ||  || align=right | 1.3 km || 
|-id=617 bgcolor=#d6d6d6
| 610617 ||  || — || February 21, 2006 || Mount Lemmon || Mount Lemmon Survey ||  || align=right | 3.0 km || 
|-id=618 bgcolor=#d6d6d6
| 610618 ||  || — || September 17, 2003 || Kitt Peak || Spacewatch ||  || align=right | 2.8 km || 
|-id=619 bgcolor=#fefefe
| 610619 ||  || — || February 24, 2006 || Mount Lemmon || Mount Lemmon Survey || H || align=right data-sort-value="0.73" | 730 m || 
|-id=620 bgcolor=#E9E9E9
| 610620 ||  || — || February 24, 2006 || Kitt Peak || Spacewatch ||  || align=right data-sort-value="0.95" | 950 m || 
|-id=621 bgcolor=#d6d6d6
| 610621 ||  || — || February 6, 2006 || Mount Lemmon || Mount Lemmon Survey ||  || align=right | 2.4 km || 
|-id=622 bgcolor=#E9E9E9
| 610622 ||  || — || February 24, 2006 || Kitt Peak || Spacewatch ||  || align=right | 1.0 km || 
|-id=623 bgcolor=#d6d6d6
| 610623 ||  || — || February 24, 2006 || Kitt Peak || Spacewatch ||  || align=right | 2.1 km || 
|-id=624 bgcolor=#d6d6d6
| 610624 ||  || — || February 24, 2006 || Kitt Peak || Spacewatch ||  || align=right | 2.5 km || 
|-id=625 bgcolor=#fefefe
| 610625 ||  || — || February 24, 2006 || Mount Lemmon || Mount Lemmon Survey ||  || align=right data-sort-value="0.54" | 540 m || 
|-id=626 bgcolor=#E9E9E9
| 610626 ||  || — || February 24, 2006 || Kitt Peak || Spacewatch ||  || align=right | 1.1 km || 
|-id=627 bgcolor=#d6d6d6
| 610627 ||  || — || February 24, 2006 || Kitt Peak || Spacewatch ||  || align=right | 2.8 km || 
|-id=628 bgcolor=#d6d6d6
| 610628 ||  || — || February 24, 2006 || Mount Lemmon || Mount Lemmon Survey ||  || align=right | 3.0 km || 
|-id=629 bgcolor=#d6d6d6
| 610629 ||  || — || February 20, 2006 || Kitt Peak || Spacewatch ||  || align=right | 2.3 km || 
|-id=630 bgcolor=#d6d6d6
| 610630 ||  || — || January 7, 2006 || Mount Lemmon || Mount Lemmon Survey ||  || align=right | 3.7 km || 
|-id=631 bgcolor=#d6d6d6
| 610631 ||  || — || October 24, 2005 || Mauna Kea || Mauna Kea Obs. ||  || align=right | 2.5 km || 
|-id=632 bgcolor=#E9E9E9
| 610632 ||  || — || December 2, 2005 || Kitt Peak || L. H. Wasserman, R. Millis ||  || align=right | 1.0 km || 
|-id=633 bgcolor=#E9E9E9
| 610633 ||  || — || October 23, 2004 || Kitt Peak || Spacewatch ||  || align=right | 1.4 km || 
|-id=634 bgcolor=#d6d6d6
| 610634 ||  || — || February 27, 2006 || Catalina || CSS ||  || align=right | 3.2 km || 
|-id=635 bgcolor=#d6d6d6
| 610635 ||  || — || February 25, 2006 || Kitt Peak || Spacewatch ||  || align=right | 2.7 km || 
|-id=636 bgcolor=#E9E9E9
| 610636 ||  || — || February 25, 2006 || Kitt Peak || Spacewatch ||  || align=right data-sort-value="0.78" | 780 m || 
|-id=637 bgcolor=#d6d6d6
| 610637 ||  || — || February 25, 2006 || Kitt Peak || Spacewatch ||  || align=right | 2.2 km || 
|-id=638 bgcolor=#d6d6d6
| 610638 ||  || — || February 1, 2006 || Kitt Peak || Spacewatch ||  || align=right | 2.2 km || 
|-id=639 bgcolor=#E9E9E9
| 610639 ||  || — || February 2, 2006 || Kitt Peak || Spacewatch ||  || align=right data-sort-value="0.83" | 830 m || 
|-id=640 bgcolor=#d6d6d6
| 610640 ||  || — || February 25, 2006 || Kitt Peak || Spacewatch ||  || align=right | 2.6 km || 
|-id=641 bgcolor=#fefefe
| 610641 ||  || — || October 15, 2001 || Palomar || NEAT ||  || align=right data-sort-value="0.80" | 800 m || 
|-id=642 bgcolor=#d6d6d6
| 610642 ||  || — || February 25, 2006 || Kitt Peak || Spacewatch ||  || align=right | 2.7 km || 
|-id=643 bgcolor=#d6d6d6
| 610643 ||  || — || February 25, 2006 || Kitt Peak || Spacewatch ||  || align=right | 2.2 km || 
|-id=644 bgcolor=#E9E9E9
| 610644 ||  || — || February 25, 2006 || Mount Lemmon || Mount Lemmon Survey ||  || align=right | 1.9 km || 
|-id=645 bgcolor=#d6d6d6
| 610645 ||  || — || February 5, 2000 || Kitt Peak || Spacewatch ||  || align=right | 2.8 km || 
|-id=646 bgcolor=#E9E9E9
| 610646 ||  || — || February 25, 2006 || Kitt Peak || Spacewatch ||  || align=right | 1.5 km || 
|-id=647 bgcolor=#E9E9E9
| 610647 ||  || — || February 27, 2006 || Kitt Peak || Spacewatch ||  || align=right data-sort-value="0.76" | 760 m || 
|-id=648 bgcolor=#d6d6d6
| 610648 ||  || — || February 27, 2006 || Kitt Peak || Spacewatch ||  || align=right | 2.4 km || 
|-id=649 bgcolor=#E9E9E9
| 610649 ||  || — || February 27, 2006 || Kitt Peak || Spacewatch ||  || align=right | 1.9 km || 
|-id=650 bgcolor=#E9E9E9
| 610650 ||  || — || February 27, 2006 || Mount Lemmon || Mount Lemmon Survey ||  || align=right data-sort-value="0.80" | 800 m || 
|-id=651 bgcolor=#E9E9E9
| 610651 ||  || — || February 27, 2006 || Mount Lemmon || Mount Lemmon Survey ||  || align=right | 1.2 km || 
|-id=652 bgcolor=#E9E9E9
| 610652 ||  || — || October 4, 2004 || Kitt Peak || Spacewatch ||  || align=right data-sort-value="0.93" | 930 m || 
|-id=653 bgcolor=#fefefe
| 610653 ||  || — || February 27, 2006 || Kitt Peak || Spacewatch ||  || align=right data-sort-value="0.55" | 550 m || 
|-id=654 bgcolor=#d6d6d6
| 610654 ||  || — || February 27, 2006 || Kitt Peak || Spacewatch ||  || align=right | 2.7 km || 
|-id=655 bgcolor=#E9E9E9
| 610655 ||  || — || February 27, 2006 || Kitt Peak || Spacewatch ||  || align=right data-sort-value="0.87" | 870 m || 
|-id=656 bgcolor=#d6d6d6
| 610656 ||  || — || February 27, 2006 || Mount Lemmon || Mount Lemmon Survey ||  || align=right | 2.1 km || 
|-id=657 bgcolor=#E9E9E9
| 610657 ||  || — || February 27, 2006 || Mount Lemmon || Mount Lemmon Survey ||  || align=right data-sort-value="0.82" | 820 m || 
|-id=658 bgcolor=#d6d6d6
| 610658 ||  || — || September 18, 2003 || Kitt Peak || Spacewatch ||  || align=right | 2.5 km || 
|-id=659 bgcolor=#d6d6d6
| 610659 ||  || — || February 27, 2006 || Mount Lemmon || Mount Lemmon Survey ||  || align=right | 2.5 km || 
|-id=660 bgcolor=#d6d6d6
| 610660 ||  || — || January 23, 2006 || Mount Lemmon || Mount Lemmon Survey ||  || align=right | 2.4 km || 
|-id=661 bgcolor=#d6d6d6
| 610661 ||  || — || September 19, 2003 || Kitt Peak || Spacewatch ||  || align=right | 2.8 km || 
|-id=662 bgcolor=#E9E9E9
| 610662 ||  || — || February 27, 2006 || Mount Lemmon || Mount Lemmon Survey ||  || align=right data-sort-value="0.81" | 810 m || 
|-id=663 bgcolor=#d6d6d6
| 610663 ||  || — || February 27, 2006 || Mount Lemmon || Mount Lemmon Survey ||  || align=right | 2.4 km || 
|-id=664 bgcolor=#d6d6d6
| 610664 ||  || — || October 27, 2003 || Kitt Peak || Spacewatch ||  || align=right | 3.2 km || 
|-id=665 bgcolor=#d6d6d6
| 610665 ||  || — || February 27, 2006 || Kitt Peak || Spacewatch ||  || align=right | 2.7 km || 
|-id=666 bgcolor=#d6d6d6
| 610666 ||  || — || October 18, 2004 || Kitt Peak || M. W. Buie, D. E. Trilling ||  || align=right | 1.8 km || 
|-id=667 bgcolor=#d6d6d6
| 610667 ||  || — || February 24, 2006 || Catalina || CSS ||  || align=right | 3.6 km || 
|-id=668 bgcolor=#E9E9E9
| 610668 ||  || — || March 18, 2002 || Kitt Peak || Spacewatch ||  || align=right data-sort-value="0.85" | 850 m || 
|-id=669 bgcolor=#d6d6d6
| 610669 ||  || — || February 22, 2006 || Anderson Mesa || LONEOS ||  || align=right | 3.4 km || 
|-id=670 bgcolor=#d6d6d6
| 610670 ||  || — || February 25, 2006 || Catalina || CSS ||  || align=right | 2.5 km || 
|-id=671 bgcolor=#E9E9E9
| 610671 ||  || — || February 25, 2006 || Kitt Peak || Spacewatch ||  || align=right data-sort-value="0.97" | 970 m || 
|-id=672 bgcolor=#fefefe
| 610672 ||  || — || February 25, 2006 || Kitt Peak || Spacewatch ||  || align=right data-sort-value="0.51" | 510 m || 
|-id=673 bgcolor=#fefefe
| 610673 ||  || — || February 25, 2006 || Mount Lemmon || Mount Lemmon Survey ||  || align=right data-sort-value="0.49" | 490 m || 
|-id=674 bgcolor=#E9E9E9
| 610674 ||  || — || July 25, 2003 || Socorro || LINEAR ||  || align=right | 1.2 km || 
|-id=675 bgcolor=#E9E9E9
| 610675 ||  || — || February 25, 2006 || Mount Lemmon || Mount Lemmon Survey ||  || align=right data-sort-value="0.81" | 810 m || 
|-id=676 bgcolor=#d6d6d6
| 610676 ||  || — || February 25, 2012 || Catalina || CSS ||  || align=right | 3.1 km || 
|-id=677 bgcolor=#d6d6d6
| 610677 ||  || — || January 23, 2011 || Mount Lemmon || Mount Lemmon Survey ||  || align=right | 2.4 km || 
|-id=678 bgcolor=#E9E9E9
| 610678 ||  || — || February 24, 2006 || Kitt Peak || Spacewatch ||  || align=right data-sort-value="0.67" | 670 m || 
|-id=679 bgcolor=#fefefe
| 610679 ||  || — || December 24, 2013 || Mount Lemmon || Mount Lemmon Survey || H || align=right data-sort-value="0.57" | 570 m || 
|-id=680 bgcolor=#E9E9E9
| 610680 ||  || — || September 23, 2008 || Kitt Peak || Spacewatch ||  || align=right data-sort-value="0.79" | 790 m || 
|-id=681 bgcolor=#E9E9E9
| 610681 ||  || — || February 20, 2006 || Kitt Peak || Spacewatch ||  || align=right data-sort-value="0.81" | 810 m || 
|-id=682 bgcolor=#d6d6d6
| 610682 ||  || — || November 17, 2004 || Siding Spring || SSS ||  || align=right | 3.1 km || 
|-id=683 bgcolor=#d6d6d6
| 610683 ||  || — || May 13, 2007 || Kitt Peak || Spacewatch ||  || align=right | 2.3 km || 
|-id=684 bgcolor=#d6d6d6
| 610684 ||  || — || April 12, 2012 || Haleakala || Pan-STARRS ||  || align=right | 2.3 km || 
|-id=685 bgcolor=#E9E9E9
| 610685 ||  || — || March 22, 2015 || Haleakala || Pan-STARRS ||  || align=right | 1.0 km || 
|-id=686 bgcolor=#fefefe
| 610686 ||  || — || March 13, 2016 || Haleakala || Pan-STARRS ||  || align=right data-sort-value="0.54" | 540 m || 
|-id=687 bgcolor=#E9E9E9
| 610687 ||  || — || October 6, 2008 || Kitt Peak || Spacewatch ||  || align=right | 1.1 km || 
|-id=688 bgcolor=#d6d6d6
| 610688 ||  || — || January 23, 2011 || Mount Lemmon || Mount Lemmon Survey ||  || align=right | 2.7 km || 
|-id=689 bgcolor=#E9E9E9
| 610689 ||  || — || February 27, 2014 || Kitt Peak || Spacewatch ||  || align=right data-sort-value="0.92" | 920 m || 
|-id=690 bgcolor=#fefefe
| 610690 ||  || — || April 12, 2016 || Haleakala || Pan-STARRS ||  || align=right data-sort-value="0.55" | 550 m || 
|-id=691 bgcolor=#d6d6d6
| 610691 ||  || — || March 2, 2006 || Kitt Peak || Spacewatch ||  || align=right | 1.8 km || 
|-id=692 bgcolor=#E9E9E9
| 610692 ||  || — || February 20, 2006 || Kitt Peak || Spacewatch ||  || align=right | 1.1 km || 
|-id=693 bgcolor=#d6d6d6
| 610693 ||  || — || December 3, 2005 || Mauna Kea || Mauna Kea Obs. ||  || align=right | 2.2 km || 
|-id=694 bgcolor=#d6d6d6
| 610694 ||  || — || March 2, 2006 || Kitt Peak || Spacewatch ||  || align=right | 2.5 km || 
|-id=695 bgcolor=#d6d6d6
| 610695 ||  || — || March 2, 2006 || Kitt Peak || Spacewatch ||  || align=right | 1.9 km || 
|-id=696 bgcolor=#d6d6d6
| 610696 ||  || — || March 2, 2006 || Kitt Peak || Spacewatch ||  || align=right | 2.1 km || 
|-id=697 bgcolor=#E9E9E9
| 610697 ||  || — || February 22, 2006 || Catalina || CSS ||  || align=right | 1.7 km || 
|-id=698 bgcolor=#d6d6d6
| 610698 ||  || — || March 3, 2006 || Kitt Peak || Spacewatch ||  || align=right | 2.5 km || 
|-id=699 bgcolor=#d6d6d6
| 610699 ||  || — || February 21, 2006 || Mount Lemmon || Mount Lemmon Survey ||  || align=right | 2.2 km || 
|-id=700 bgcolor=#d6d6d6
| 610700 ||  || — || February 2, 2006 || Kitt Peak || Spacewatch ||  || align=right | 2.3 km || 
|}

610701–610800 

|-bgcolor=#d6d6d6
| 610701 ||  || — || March 3, 2006 || Kitt Peak || Spacewatch ||  || align=right | 2.6 km || 
|-id=702 bgcolor=#E9E9E9
| 610702 ||  || — || March 21, 2002 || Kitt Peak || Spacewatch ||  || align=right data-sort-value="0.87" | 870 m || 
|-id=703 bgcolor=#E9E9E9
| 610703 ||  || — || March 3, 2006 || Kitt Peak || Spacewatch ||  || align=right data-sort-value="0.97" | 970 m || 
|-id=704 bgcolor=#d6d6d6
| 610704 ||  || — || March 3, 2006 || Kitt Peak || Spacewatch ||  || align=right | 2.3 km || 
|-id=705 bgcolor=#d6d6d6
| 610705 ||  || — || February 2, 2006 || Mount Lemmon || Mount Lemmon Survey ||  || align=right | 3.4 km || 
|-id=706 bgcolor=#E9E9E9
| 610706 ||  || — || March 3, 2006 || Kitt Peak || Spacewatch ||  || align=right | 1.1 km || 
|-id=707 bgcolor=#d6d6d6
| 610707 ||  || — || March 3, 2006 || Kitt Peak || Spacewatch ||  || align=right | 2.7 km || 
|-id=708 bgcolor=#E9E9E9
| 610708 ||  || — || December 3, 2005 || Mauna Kea || Mauna Kea Obs. ||  || align=right | 1.1 km || 
|-id=709 bgcolor=#E9E9E9
| 610709 ||  || — || March 3, 2006 || Kitt Peak || Spacewatch ||  || align=right data-sort-value="0.85" | 850 m || 
|-id=710 bgcolor=#d6d6d6
| 610710 ||  || — || March 3, 2006 || Kitt Peak || Spacewatch ||  || align=right | 2.7 km || 
|-id=711 bgcolor=#d6d6d6
| 610711 ||  || — || January 31, 2006 || Kitt Peak || Spacewatch ||  || align=right | 2.0 km || 
|-id=712 bgcolor=#d6d6d6
| 610712 ||  || — || October 20, 2003 || Kitt Peak || Spacewatch ||  || align=right | 2.6 km || 
|-id=713 bgcolor=#d6d6d6
| 610713 ||  || — || March 4, 2006 || Kitt Peak || Spacewatch ||  || align=right | 2.9 km || 
|-id=714 bgcolor=#d6d6d6
| 610714 ||  || — || February 1, 2006 || Kitt Peak || Spacewatch ||  || align=right | 2.6 km || 
|-id=715 bgcolor=#fefefe
| 610715 ||  || — || January 31, 2006 || Kitt Peak || Spacewatch ||  || align=right data-sort-value="0.56" | 560 m || 
|-id=716 bgcolor=#E9E9E9
| 610716 ||  || — || February 25, 2006 || Kitt Peak || Spacewatch ||  || align=right data-sort-value="0.94" | 940 m || 
|-id=717 bgcolor=#d6d6d6
| 610717 ||  || — || March 4, 2006 || Kitt Peak || Spacewatch ||  || align=right | 2.0 km || 
|-id=718 bgcolor=#fefefe
| 610718 ||  || — || March 4, 2006 || Kitt Peak || Spacewatch ||  || align=right data-sort-value="0.75" | 750 m || 
|-id=719 bgcolor=#E9E9E9
| 610719 ||  || — || February 24, 2006 || Mount Lemmon || Mount Lemmon Survey ||  || align=right | 1.1 km || 
|-id=720 bgcolor=#d6d6d6
| 610720 ||  || — || March 3, 2006 || Kitt Peak || Spacewatch ||  || align=right | 2.8 km || 
|-id=721 bgcolor=#d6d6d6
| 610721 ||  || — || October 24, 2005 || Mauna Kea || Mauna Kea Obs. ||  || align=right | 3.0 km || 
|-id=722 bgcolor=#d6d6d6
| 610722 ||  || — || December 2, 2005 || Mauna Kea || Mauna Kea Obs. ||  || align=right | 2.9 km || 
|-id=723 bgcolor=#d6d6d6
| 610723 ||  || — || March 5, 2006 || Kitt Peak || Spacewatch ||  || align=right | 2.9 km || 
|-id=724 bgcolor=#d6d6d6
| 610724 ||  || — || March 5, 2006 || Kitt Peak || Spacewatch ||  || align=right | 2.8 km || 
|-id=725 bgcolor=#d6d6d6
| 610725 ||  || — || March 5, 2006 || Kitt Peak || Spacewatch ||  || align=right | 2.5 km || 
|-id=726 bgcolor=#d6d6d6
| 610726 ||  || — || March 5, 2006 || Kitt Peak || Spacewatch ||  || align=right | 2.8 km || 
|-id=727 bgcolor=#E9E9E9
| 610727 ||  || — || March 5, 2006 || Kitt Peak || Spacewatch ||  || align=right | 2.2 km || 
|-id=728 bgcolor=#E9E9E9
| 610728 ||  || — || March 5, 2006 || Kitt Peak || Spacewatch ||  || align=right data-sort-value="0.98" | 980 m || 
|-id=729 bgcolor=#d6d6d6
| 610729 ||  || — || March 5, 2006 || Kitt Peak || Spacewatch ||  || align=right | 2.1 km || 
|-id=730 bgcolor=#d6d6d6
| 610730 ||  || — || March 5, 2006 || Kitt Peak || Spacewatch ||  || align=right | 2.1 km || 
|-id=731 bgcolor=#fefefe
| 610731 ||  || — || March 8, 2006 || Kitt Peak || Spacewatch ||  || align=right data-sort-value="0.53" | 530 m || 
|-id=732 bgcolor=#d6d6d6
| 610732 ||  || — || December 4, 2015 || Haleakala || Pan-STARRS ||  || align=right | 2.4 km || 
|-id=733 bgcolor=#fefefe
| 610733 ||  || — || March 4, 2006 || Mount Lemmon || Mount Lemmon Survey ||  || align=right data-sort-value="0.57" | 570 m || 
|-id=734 bgcolor=#E9E9E9
| 610734 ||  || — || March 3, 2006 || Anderson Mesa || LONEOS ||  || align=right data-sort-value="0.99" | 990 m || 
|-id=735 bgcolor=#E9E9E9
| 610735 ||  || — || February 15, 2010 || Kitt Peak || Spacewatch ||  || align=right data-sort-value="0.78" | 780 m || 
|-id=736 bgcolor=#d6d6d6
| 610736 ||  || — || July 31, 2014 || Haleakala || Pan-STARRS ||  || align=right | 2.5 km || 
|-id=737 bgcolor=#d6d6d6
| 610737 ||  || — || October 10, 2015 || Haleakala || Pan-STARRS ||  || align=right | 3.2 km || 
|-id=738 bgcolor=#d6d6d6
| 610738 ||  || — || January 27, 2006 || Kitt Peak || Spacewatch ||  || align=right | 2.7 km || 
|-id=739 bgcolor=#fefefe
| 610739 ||  || — || March 15, 2013 || Kitt Peak || Spacewatch ||  || align=right data-sort-value="0.50" | 500 m || 
|-id=740 bgcolor=#d6d6d6
| 610740 ||  || — || January 29, 2011 || Mount Lemmon || Mount Lemmon Survey ||  || align=right | 2.1 km || 
|-id=741 bgcolor=#d6d6d6
| 610741 ||  || — || January 30, 2011 || Mount Lemmon || Mount Lemmon Survey ||  || align=right | 2.8 km || 
|-id=742 bgcolor=#d6d6d6
| 610742 ||  || — || August 22, 2014 || Haleakala || Pan-STARRS ||  || align=right | 2.1 km || 
|-id=743 bgcolor=#fefefe
| 610743 ||  || — || March 18, 2013 || Kitt Peak || Spacewatch ||  || align=right data-sort-value="0.64" | 640 m || 
|-id=744 bgcolor=#E9E9E9
| 610744 ||  || — || January 9, 2014 || Haleakala || Pan-STARRS ||  || align=right data-sort-value="0.87" | 870 m || 
|-id=745 bgcolor=#E9E9E9
| 610745 ||  || — || December 2, 2012 || Mount Lemmon || Mount Lemmon Survey ||  || align=right data-sort-value="0.83" | 830 m || 
|-id=746 bgcolor=#fefefe
| 610746 ||  || — || March 2, 2006 || Kitt Peak || Spacewatch ||  || align=right data-sort-value="0.57" | 570 m || 
|-id=747 bgcolor=#d6d6d6
| 610747 ||  || — || September 23, 2014 || Mount Lemmon || Mount Lemmon Survey ||  || align=right | 2.4 km || 
|-id=748 bgcolor=#E9E9E9
| 610748 ||  || — || October 15, 2012 || Haleakala || Pan-STARRS ||  || align=right | 1.1 km || 
|-id=749 bgcolor=#d6d6d6
| 610749 ||  || — || September 6, 2008 || Mount Lemmon || Mount Lemmon Survey ||  || align=right | 2.4 km || 
|-id=750 bgcolor=#E9E9E9
| 610750 ||  || — || March 12, 2010 || Kitt Peak || Spacewatch ||  || align=right data-sort-value="0.89" | 890 m || 
|-id=751 bgcolor=#d6d6d6
| 610751 ||  || — || March 3, 2006 || Kitt Peak || Spacewatch ||  || align=right | 2.2 km || 
|-id=752 bgcolor=#fefefe
| 610752 ||  || — || June 15, 2010 || Mount Lemmon || Mount Lemmon Survey ||  || align=right data-sort-value="0.61" | 610 m || 
|-id=753 bgcolor=#E9E9E9
| 610753 ||  || — || March 21, 2015 || Haleakala || Pan-STARRS ||  || align=right | 1.1 km || 
|-id=754 bgcolor=#fefefe
| 610754 ||  || — || March 4, 2006 || Mount Lemmon || Mount Lemmon Survey ||  || align=right data-sort-value="0.53" | 530 m || 
|-id=755 bgcolor=#E9E9E9
| 610755 ||  || — || March 2, 2006 || Kitt Peak || Spacewatch ||  || align=right | 1.4 km || 
|-id=756 bgcolor=#E9E9E9
| 610756 ||  || — || February 24, 2006 || Kitt Peak || Spacewatch ||  || align=right data-sort-value="0.68" | 680 m || 
|-id=757 bgcolor=#fefefe
| 610757 ||  || — || March 23, 2006 || Mount Lemmon || Mount Lemmon Survey ||  || align=right data-sort-value="0.59" | 590 m || 
|-id=758 bgcolor=#d6d6d6
| 610758 ||  || — || March 4, 2006 || Mount Lemmon || Mount Lemmon Survey ||  || align=right | 2.7 km || 
|-id=759 bgcolor=#fefefe
| 610759 ||  || — || March 24, 2006 || Mount Lemmon || Mount Lemmon Survey ||  || align=right data-sort-value="0.57" | 570 m || 
|-id=760 bgcolor=#E9E9E9
| 610760 ||  || — || March 24, 2006 || Mount Lemmon || Mount Lemmon Survey ||  || align=right data-sort-value="0.60" | 600 m || 
|-id=761 bgcolor=#E9E9E9
| 610761 ||  || — || March 25, 2006 || Kitt Peak || Spacewatch ||  || align=right data-sort-value="0.62" | 620 m || 
|-id=762 bgcolor=#E9E9E9
| 610762 ||  || — || October 31, 2005 || Mauna Kea || Mauna Kea Obs. ||  || align=right data-sort-value="0.79" | 790 m || 
|-id=763 bgcolor=#fefefe
| 610763 ||  || — || March 25, 2006 || Kitt Peak || Spacewatch ||  || align=right data-sort-value="0.68" | 680 m || 
|-id=764 bgcolor=#d6d6d6
| 610764 ||  || — || March 24, 2006 || Siding Spring || SSS ||  || align=right | 4.0 km || 
|-id=765 bgcolor=#fefefe
| 610765 ||  || — || December 3, 2005 || Mauna Kea || Mauna Kea Obs. ||  || align=right data-sort-value="0.57" | 570 m || 
|-id=766 bgcolor=#d6d6d6
| 610766 ||  || — || March 23, 2006 || Catalina || CSS ||  || align=right | 3.0 km || 
|-id=767 bgcolor=#fefefe
| 610767 ||  || — || March 24, 2006 || Mount Lemmon || Mount Lemmon Survey ||  || align=right data-sort-value="0.57" | 570 m || 
|-id=768 bgcolor=#fefefe
| 610768 ||  || — || March 24, 2006 || Kitt Peak || Spacewatch ||  || align=right data-sort-value="0.61" | 610 m || 
|-id=769 bgcolor=#d6d6d6
| 610769 ||  || — || January 27, 2011 || Kitt Peak || Spacewatch ||  || align=right | 1.9 km || 
|-id=770 bgcolor=#d6d6d6
| 610770 ||  || — || March 23, 2006 || Kitt Peak || Spacewatch ||  || align=right | 3.1 km || 
|-id=771 bgcolor=#E9E9E9
| 610771 ||  || — || March 25, 2006 || Kitt Peak || Spacewatch ||  || align=right | 1.4 km || 
|-id=772 bgcolor=#fefefe
| 610772 ||  || — || February 11, 2016 || Mount Lemmon || Mount Lemmon Survey ||  || align=right data-sort-value="0.55" | 550 m || 
|-id=773 bgcolor=#d6d6d6
| 610773 ||  || — || December 13, 2010 || Mount Lemmon || Mount Lemmon Survey ||  || align=right | 3.0 km || 
|-id=774 bgcolor=#d6d6d6
| 610774 ||  || — || April 20, 2012 || Mount Lemmon || Mount Lemmon Survey ||  || align=right | 2.8 km || 
|-id=775 bgcolor=#d6d6d6
| 610775 ||  || — || January 25, 2011 || Kitt Peak || Spacewatch ||  || align=right | 2.6 km || 
|-id=776 bgcolor=#E9E9E9
| 610776 ||  || — || October 10, 2016 || Haleakala || Pan-STARRS ||  || align=right | 1.3 km || 
|-id=777 bgcolor=#d6d6d6
| 610777 ||  || — || February 5, 2011 || Haleakala || Pan-STARRS ||  || align=right | 2.2 km || 
|-id=778 bgcolor=#d6d6d6
| 610778 ||  || — || March 23, 2006 || Kitt Peak || Spacewatch ||  || align=right | 2.2 km || 
|-id=779 bgcolor=#d6d6d6
| 610779 ||  || — || March 23, 2006 || Kitt Peak || Spacewatch ||  || align=right | 2.2 km || 
|-id=780 bgcolor=#fefefe
| 610780 ||  || — || October 24, 2014 || Kitt Peak || Spacewatch ||  || align=right data-sort-value="0.64" | 640 m || 
|-id=781 bgcolor=#fefefe
| 610781 ||  || — || March 4, 2006 || Kitt Peak || Spacewatch ||  || align=right data-sort-value="0.56" | 560 m || 
|-id=782 bgcolor=#E9E9E9
| 610782 ||  || — || October 6, 2012 || Mount Lemmon || Mount Lemmon Survey ||  || align=right | 1.1 km || 
|-id=783 bgcolor=#d6d6d6
| 610783 ||  || — || January 3, 2017 || Haleakala || Pan-STARRS ||  || align=right | 2.6 km || 
|-id=784 bgcolor=#fefefe
| 610784 ||  || — || March 23, 2006 || Mount Lemmon || Mount Lemmon Survey ||  || align=right data-sort-value="0.61" | 610 m || 
|-id=785 bgcolor=#E9E9E9
| 610785 ||  || — || March 26, 2006 || Kitt Peak || Spacewatch ||  || align=right data-sort-value="0.88" | 880 m || 
|-id=786 bgcolor=#fefefe
| 610786 ||  || — || April 4, 2006 || Lulin || LUSS || H || align=right data-sort-value="0.77" | 770 m || 
|-id=787 bgcolor=#fefefe
| 610787 ||  || — || February 24, 2006 || Mount Lemmon || Mount Lemmon Survey ||  || align=right data-sort-value="0.65" | 650 m || 
|-id=788 bgcolor=#d6d6d6
| 610788 ||  || — || April 2, 2006 || Kitt Peak || Spacewatch ||  || align=right | 2.6 km || 
|-id=789 bgcolor=#E9E9E9
| 610789 ||  || — || April 2, 2006 || Kitt Peak || Spacewatch ||  || align=right data-sort-value="0.89" | 890 m || 
|-id=790 bgcolor=#d6d6d6
| 610790 ||  || — || February 10, 2011 || Catalina || CSS ||  || align=right | 3.0 km || 
|-id=791 bgcolor=#E9E9E9
| 610791 ||  || — || March 23, 2006 || Kitt Peak || Spacewatch ||  || align=right | 1.5 km || 
|-id=792 bgcolor=#fefefe
| 610792 ||  || — || April 2, 2006 || Kitt Peak || Spacewatch ||  || align=right data-sort-value="0.61" | 610 m || 
|-id=793 bgcolor=#d6d6d6
| 610793 ||  || — || April 2, 2006 || Kitt Peak || Spacewatch ||  || align=right | 2.7 km || 
|-id=794 bgcolor=#d6d6d6
| 610794 ||  || — || April 2, 2006 || Kitt Peak || Spacewatch ||  || align=right | 2.6 km || 
|-id=795 bgcolor=#fefefe
| 610795 ||  || — || April 2, 2006 || Kitt Peak || Spacewatch ||  || align=right data-sort-value="0.64" | 640 m || 
|-id=796 bgcolor=#d6d6d6
| 610796 ||  || — || April 7, 2006 || Kitt Peak || Spacewatch ||  || align=right | 2.4 km || 
|-id=797 bgcolor=#fefefe
| 610797 ||  || — || April 7, 2006 || Kitt Peak || Spacewatch ||  || align=right data-sort-value="0.62" | 620 m || 
|-id=798 bgcolor=#d6d6d6
| 610798 ||  || — || April 2, 2006 || Kitt Peak || Spacewatch ||  || align=right | 2.4 km || 
|-id=799 bgcolor=#d6d6d6
| 610799 ||  || — || October 28, 1998 || Kitt Peak || Spacewatch ||  || align=right | 2.3 km || 
|-id=800 bgcolor=#d6d6d6
| 610800 ||  || — || January 30, 2011 || Mount Lemmon || Mount Lemmon Survey ||  || align=right | 2.2 km || 
|}

610801–610900 

|-bgcolor=#d6d6d6
| 610801 ||  || — || April 2, 2006 || Kitt Peak || Spacewatch ||  || align=right | 2.5 km || 
|-id=802 bgcolor=#fefefe
| 610802 ||  || — || April 17, 2013 || Haleakala || Pan-STARRS ||  || align=right data-sort-value="0.50" | 500 m || 
|-id=803 bgcolor=#fefefe
| 610803 ||  || — || April 9, 2006 || Kitt Peak || Spacewatch ||  || align=right data-sort-value="0.69" | 690 m || 
|-id=804 bgcolor=#fefefe
| 610804 ||  || — || January 17, 2016 || Haleakala || Pan-STARRS ||  || align=right data-sort-value="0.56" | 560 m || 
|-id=805 bgcolor=#E9E9E9
| 610805 ||  || — || April 30, 2015 || Kitt Peak || Spacewatch ||  || align=right | 1.3 km || 
|-id=806 bgcolor=#E9E9E9
| 610806 ||  || — || October 29, 2017 || Haleakala || Pan-STARRS ||  || align=right | 1.3 km || 
|-id=807 bgcolor=#d6d6d6
| 610807 ||  || — || September 18, 2014 || Haleakala || Pan-STARRS ||  || align=right | 2.5 km || 
|-id=808 bgcolor=#E9E9E9
| 610808 ||  || — || March 25, 2006 || Kitt Peak || Spacewatch ||  || align=right | 1.5 km || 
|-id=809 bgcolor=#E9E9E9
| 610809 ||  || — || April 19, 2006 || Kitt Peak || Spacewatch ||  || align=right | 1.3 km || 
|-id=810 bgcolor=#d6d6d6
| 610810 ||  || — || April 19, 2006 || Kitt Peak || Spacewatch ||  || align=right | 3.1 km || 
|-id=811 bgcolor=#d6d6d6
| 610811 ||  || — || April 19, 2006 || Palomar || NEAT ||  || align=right | 3.4 km || 
|-id=812 bgcolor=#E9E9E9
| 610812 ||  || — || April 21, 2006 || Kitt Peak || Spacewatch ||  || align=right data-sort-value="0.84" | 840 m || 
|-id=813 bgcolor=#d6d6d6
| 610813 ||  || — || April 21, 2006 || Kitt Peak || Spacewatch || 7:4 || align=right | 3.4 km || 
|-id=814 bgcolor=#E9E9E9
| 610814 ||  || — || April 24, 2006 || Mount Lemmon || Mount Lemmon Survey ||  || align=right | 1.1 km || 
|-id=815 bgcolor=#fefefe
| 610815 ||  || — || April 24, 2006 || Kitt Peak || Spacewatch ||  || align=right data-sort-value="0.76" | 760 m || 
|-id=816 bgcolor=#fefefe
| 610816 ||  || — || April 24, 2006 || Reedy Creek || J. Broughton ||  || align=right data-sort-value="0.89" | 890 m || 
|-id=817 bgcolor=#E9E9E9
| 610817 ||  || — || April 30, 2006 || Vallemare Borbona || V. S. Casulli ||  || align=right | 1.5 km || 
|-id=818 bgcolor=#E9E9E9
| 610818 ||  || — || October 20, 2003 || Kitt Peak || Spacewatch ||  || align=right | 1.9 km || 
|-id=819 bgcolor=#E9E9E9
| 610819 ||  || — || April 22, 2006 || Siding Spring || SSS ||  || align=right | 1.7 km || 
|-id=820 bgcolor=#E9E9E9
| 610820 ||  || — || April 8, 2006 || Kitt Peak || Spacewatch ||  || align=right | 1.1 km || 
|-id=821 bgcolor=#d6d6d6
| 610821 ||  || — || April 24, 2006 || Kitt Peak || Spacewatch ||  || align=right | 2.3 km || 
|-id=822 bgcolor=#d6d6d6
| 610822 ||  || — || April 24, 2006 || Mount Lemmon || Mount Lemmon Survey ||  || align=right | 2.7 km || 
|-id=823 bgcolor=#E9E9E9
| 610823 ||  || — || April 25, 2006 || Kitt Peak || Spacewatch ||  || align=right | 1.6 km || 
|-id=824 bgcolor=#d6d6d6
| 610824 ||  || — || March 5, 2006 || Mount Lemmon || Mount Lemmon Survey ||  || align=right | 2.6 km || 
|-id=825 bgcolor=#E9E9E9
| 610825 ||  || — || April 26, 2006 || Kitt Peak || Spacewatch ||  || align=right | 1.5 km || 
|-id=826 bgcolor=#d6d6d6
| 610826 ||  || — || April 29, 2006 || Kitt Peak || Spacewatch ||  || align=right | 2.7 km || 
|-id=827 bgcolor=#E9E9E9
| 610827 ||  || — || April 26, 2006 || Kitt Peak || Spacewatch ||  || align=right | 1.2 km || 
|-id=828 bgcolor=#E9E9E9
| 610828 ||  || — || April 30, 2006 || Kitt Peak || Spacewatch ||  || align=right | 1.2 km || 
|-id=829 bgcolor=#d6d6d6
| 610829 ||  || — || April 30, 2006 || Kitt Peak || Spacewatch || 7:4 || align=right | 2.9 km || 
|-id=830 bgcolor=#d6d6d6
| 610830 ||  || — || April 30, 2006 || Kitt Peak || Spacewatch ||  || align=right | 2.8 km || 
|-id=831 bgcolor=#d6d6d6
| 610831 ||  || — || April 20, 2006 || Catalina || CSS ||  || align=right | 3.0 km || 
|-id=832 bgcolor=#fefefe
| 610832 ||  || — || April 30, 2006 || Kitt Peak || Spacewatch ||  || align=right data-sort-value="0.58" | 580 m || 
|-id=833 bgcolor=#fefefe
| 610833 ||  || — || April 25, 2006 || Kitt Peak || Spacewatch ||  || align=right data-sort-value="0.49" | 490 m || 
|-id=834 bgcolor=#d6d6d6
| 610834 ||  || — || April 2, 2006 || Kitt Peak || Spacewatch ||  || align=right | 2.3 km || 
|-id=835 bgcolor=#fefefe
| 610835 ||  || — || April 26, 2006 || Kitt Peak || Spacewatch ||  || align=right data-sort-value="0.54" | 540 m || 
|-id=836 bgcolor=#fefefe
| 610836 ||  || — || April 30, 2006 || Kitt Peak || Spacewatch ||  || align=right data-sort-value="0.60" | 600 m || 
|-id=837 bgcolor=#E9E9E9
| 610837 ||  || — || April 2, 2006 || Mount Lemmon || Mount Lemmon Survey ||  || align=right | 1.2 km || 
|-id=838 bgcolor=#E9E9E9
| 610838 ||  || — || April 30, 2006 || Kitt Peak || Spacewatch ||  || align=right | 1.6 km || 
|-id=839 bgcolor=#d6d6d6
| 610839 ||  || — || April 24, 2006 || Kitt Peak || Spacewatch ||  || align=right | 2.7 km || 
|-id=840 bgcolor=#d6d6d6
| 610840 ||  || — || April 26, 2006 || Cerro Tololo || Cerro Tololo Obs. ||  || align=right | 2.2 km || 
|-id=841 bgcolor=#E9E9E9
| 610841 ||  || — || January 26, 2006 || Kitt Peak || Spacewatch ||  || align=right data-sort-value="0.66" | 660 m || 
|-id=842 bgcolor=#d6d6d6
| 610842 ||  || — || April 26, 2006 || Cerro Tololo || Cerro Tololo Obs. ||  || align=right | 2.2 km || 
|-id=843 bgcolor=#d6d6d6
| 610843 ||  || — || March 26, 2006 || Mount Lemmon || Mount Lemmon Survey ||  || align=right | 2.7 km || 
|-id=844 bgcolor=#fefefe
| 610844 ||  || — || April 26, 2006 || Cerro Tololo || Cerro Tololo Obs. ||  || align=right data-sort-value="0.87" | 870 m || 
|-id=845 bgcolor=#fefefe
| 610845 ||  || — || May 26, 2006 || Mount Lemmon || Mount Lemmon Survey ||  || align=right data-sort-value="0.73" | 730 m || 
|-id=846 bgcolor=#d6d6d6
| 610846 ||  || — || September 16, 2003 || Kitt Peak || Spacewatch ||  || align=right | 2.4 km || 
|-id=847 bgcolor=#E9E9E9
| 610847 ||  || — || April 27, 2006 || Cerro Tololo || Cerro Tololo Obs. ||  || align=right data-sort-value="0.66" | 660 m || 
|-id=848 bgcolor=#E9E9E9
| 610848 ||  || — || May 9, 2006 || Mount Lemmon || Mount Lemmon Survey ||  || align=right | 1.8 km || 
|-id=849 bgcolor=#E9E9E9
| 610849 ||  || — || April 30, 2006 || Mauna Kea || D. J. Tholen, F. Bernardi ||  || align=right data-sort-value="0.83" | 830 m || 
|-id=850 bgcolor=#E9E9E9
| 610850 ||  || — || January 16, 2005 || Kitt Peak || Spacewatch ||  || align=right | 1.5 km || 
|-id=851 bgcolor=#d6d6d6
| 610851 ||  || — || April 25, 2006 || Mount Lemmon || Mount Lemmon Survey ||  || align=right | 2.8 km || 
|-id=852 bgcolor=#fefefe
| 610852 ||  || — || April 24, 2006 || Anderson Mesa || LONEOS ||  || align=right data-sort-value="0.71" | 710 m || 
|-id=853 bgcolor=#E9E9E9
| 610853 ||  || — || April 24, 2006 || Kitt Peak || Spacewatch ||  || align=right | 1.3 km || 
|-id=854 bgcolor=#d6d6d6
| 610854 ||  || — || April 24, 2006 || Kitt Peak || Spacewatch ||  || align=right | 3.3 km || 
|-id=855 bgcolor=#d6d6d6
| 610855 ||  || — || August 28, 2009 || Kitt Peak || Spacewatch ||  || align=right | 2.0 km || 
|-id=856 bgcolor=#E9E9E9
| 610856 ||  || — || September 19, 2007 || Dauban || F. Kugel ||  || align=right | 1.5 km || 
|-id=857 bgcolor=#E9E9E9
| 610857 ||  || — || April 20, 2006 || Kitt Peak || Spacewatch ||  || align=right | 1.1 km || 
|-id=858 bgcolor=#E9E9E9
| 610858 ||  || — || April 21, 2006 || Kitt Peak || Spacewatch ||  || align=right data-sort-value="0.73" | 730 m || 
|-id=859 bgcolor=#d6d6d6
| 610859 ||  || — || November 14, 1998 || Kitt Peak || Spacewatch ||  || align=right | 2.3 km || 
|-id=860 bgcolor=#fefefe
| 610860 ||  || — || April 24, 2006 || Kitt Peak || Spacewatch ||  || align=right data-sort-value="0.50" | 500 m || 
|-id=861 bgcolor=#d6d6d6
| 610861 ||  || — || May 1, 2006 || Kitt Peak || Spacewatch ||  || align=right | 2.2 km || 
|-id=862 bgcolor=#E9E9E9
| 610862 ||  || — || May 1, 2006 || Kitt Peak || Spacewatch ||  || align=right data-sort-value="0.85" | 850 m || 
|-id=863 bgcolor=#d6d6d6
| 610863 ||  || — || May 1, 2006 || Kitt Peak || Spacewatch ||  || align=right | 2.9 km || 
|-id=864 bgcolor=#d6d6d6
| 610864 ||  || — || May 1, 2006 || Kitt Peak || Spacewatch ||  || align=right | 3.0 km || 
|-id=865 bgcolor=#E9E9E9
| 610865 ||  || — || May 1, 2006 || Kitt Peak || Spacewatch ||  || align=right | 1.9 km || 
|-id=866 bgcolor=#d6d6d6
| 610866 ||  || — || May 1, 2006 || Kitt Peak || Spacewatch ||  || align=right | 2.9 km || 
|-id=867 bgcolor=#E9E9E9
| 610867 ||  || — || May 1, 2006 || Kitt Peak || Spacewatch ||  || align=right | 1.6 km || 
|-id=868 bgcolor=#d6d6d6
| 610868 ||  || — || May 1, 2006 || Kitt Peak || Spacewatch ||  || align=right | 2.5 km || 
|-id=869 bgcolor=#E9E9E9
| 610869 ||  || — || April 19, 2006 || Mount Lemmon || Mount Lemmon Survey ||  || align=right | 1.2 km || 
|-id=870 bgcolor=#E9E9E9
| 610870 ||  || — || May 2, 2006 || Mount Lemmon || Mount Lemmon Survey ||  || align=right data-sort-value="0.89" | 890 m || 
|-id=871 bgcolor=#E9E9E9
| 610871 ||  || — || April 24, 2006 || Kitt Peak || Spacewatch ||  || align=right | 1.8 km || 
|-id=872 bgcolor=#E9E9E9
| 610872 ||  || — || April 20, 2006 || Mount Lemmon || Mount Lemmon Survey ||  || align=right | 1.3 km || 
|-id=873 bgcolor=#E9E9E9
| 610873 ||  || — || May 2, 2006 || Kitt Peak || Spacewatch ||  || align=right | 1.4 km || 
|-id=874 bgcolor=#d6d6d6
| 610874 ||  || — || May 5, 2006 || Anderson Mesa || LONEOS ||  || align=right | 3.7 km || 
|-id=875 bgcolor=#E9E9E9
| 610875 ||  || — || April 19, 2006 || Mount Lemmon || Mount Lemmon Survey ||  || align=right data-sort-value="0.96" | 960 m || 
|-id=876 bgcolor=#d6d6d6
| 610876 ||  || — || April 25, 2006 || Mount Lemmon || Mount Lemmon Survey ||  || align=right | 2.6 km || 
|-id=877 bgcolor=#E9E9E9
| 610877 ||  || — || April 25, 2006 || Kitt Peak || Spacewatch ||  || align=right | 1.5 km || 
|-id=878 bgcolor=#d6d6d6
| 610878 ||  || — || May 6, 2006 || Kitt Peak || Spacewatch ||  || align=right | 3.0 km || 
|-id=879 bgcolor=#fefefe
| 610879 ||  || — || May 6, 2006 || Kitt Peak || Spacewatch ||  || align=right data-sort-value="0.54" | 540 m || 
|-id=880 bgcolor=#E9E9E9
| 610880 ||  || — || April 25, 2006 || Kitt Peak || Spacewatch ||  || align=right | 1.4 km || 
|-id=881 bgcolor=#fefefe
| 610881 ||  || — || May 5, 2006 || Anderson Mesa || LONEOS ||  || align=right data-sort-value="0.80" | 800 m || 
|-id=882 bgcolor=#d6d6d6
| 610882 ||  || — || January 26, 2006 || Kitt Peak || Spacewatch ||  || align=right | 2.5 km || 
|-id=883 bgcolor=#E9E9E9
| 610883 ||  || — || February 2, 2006 || Kitt Peak || Spacewatch ||  || align=right data-sort-value="0.75" | 750 m || 
|-id=884 bgcolor=#fefefe
| 610884 ||  || — || May 1, 2006 || Kitt Peak || D. E. Trilling ||  || align=right data-sort-value="0.53" | 530 m || 
|-id=885 bgcolor=#E9E9E9
| 610885 ||  || — || May 6, 2006 || Mount Lemmon || Mount Lemmon Survey ||  || align=right | 1.1 km || 
|-id=886 bgcolor=#d6d6d6
| 610886 ||  || — || May 1, 2006 || Mauna Kea || Mauna Kea Obs. ||  || align=right | 2.5 km || 
|-id=887 bgcolor=#d6d6d6
| 610887 ||  || — || May 8, 2006 || Kitt Peak || Spacewatch ||  || align=right | 2.7 km || 
|-id=888 bgcolor=#fefefe
| 610888 ||  || — || January 2, 2012 || Kitt Peak || Spacewatch ||  || align=right data-sort-value="0.62" | 620 m || 
|-id=889 bgcolor=#fefefe
| 610889 ||  || — || May 6, 2006 || Mount Lemmon || Mount Lemmon Survey ||  || align=right data-sort-value="0.69" | 690 m || 
|-id=890 bgcolor=#d6d6d6
| 610890 ||  || — || April 21, 2006 || Kitt Peak || Spacewatch ||  || align=right | 3.2 km || 
|-id=891 bgcolor=#E9E9E9
| 610891 ||  || — || October 20, 2007 || Mount Lemmon || Mount Lemmon Survey ||  || align=right | 1.5 km || 
|-id=892 bgcolor=#E9E9E9
| 610892 ||  || — || November 15, 1995 || Kitt Peak || Spacewatch ||  || align=right | 1.1 km || 
|-id=893 bgcolor=#d6d6d6
| 610893 ||  || — || October 1, 2014 || Kitt Peak || Spacewatch ||  || align=right | 2.5 km || 
|-id=894 bgcolor=#E9E9E9
| 610894 ||  || — || October 27, 2016 || Kitt Peak || Spacewatch ||  || align=right | 1.4 km || 
|-id=895 bgcolor=#fefefe
| 610895 ||  || — || May 4, 2006 || Mount Lemmon || Mount Lemmon Survey ||  || align=right data-sort-value="0.57" | 570 m || 
|-id=896 bgcolor=#fefefe
| 610896 ||  || — || January 20, 2009 || Kitt Peak || Spacewatch ||  || align=right data-sort-value="0.52" | 520 m || 
|-id=897 bgcolor=#E9E9E9
| 610897 ||  || — || May 8, 2006 || Kitt Peak || Spacewatch ||  || align=right | 1.5 km || 
|-id=898 bgcolor=#E9E9E9
| 610898 ||  || — || May 6, 2006 || Mount Lemmon || Mount Lemmon Survey ||  || align=right | 1.6 km || 
|-id=899 bgcolor=#fefefe
| 610899 ||  || — || May 19, 2006 || Mount Lemmon || Mount Lemmon Survey ||  || align=right data-sort-value="0.58" | 580 m || 
|-id=900 bgcolor=#E9E9E9
| 610900 ||  || — || May 19, 2006 || Mount Lemmon || Mount Lemmon Survey ||  || align=right | 1.4 km || 
|}

610901–611000 

|-bgcolor=#E9E9E9
| 610901 ||  || — || May 19, 2006 || Mount Lemmon || Mount Lemmon Survey ||  || align=right | 1.8 km || 
|-id=902 bgcolor=#E9E9E9
| 610902 ||  || — || May 20, 2006 || Kitt Peak || Spacewatch ||  || align=right | 1.1 km || 
|-id=903 bgcolor=#d6d6d6
| 610903 ||  || — || May 20, 2006 || Kitt Peak || Spacewatch ||  || align=right | 2.8 km || 
|-id=904 bgcolor=#d6d6d6
| 610904 ||  || — || May 20, 2006 || Kitt Peak || Spacewatch ||  || align=right | 2.9 km || 
|-id=905 bgcolor=#E9E9E9
| 610905 ||  || — || May 20, 2006 || Kitt Peak || Spacewatch ||  || align=right | 1.7 km || 
|-id=906 bgcolor=#E9E9E9
| 610906 ||  || — || May 20, 2006 || Kitt Peak || Spacewatch ||  || align=right data-sort-value="0.81" | 810 m || 
|-id=907 bgcolor=#d6d6d6
| 610907 ||  || — || May 21, 2006 || Kitt Peak || Spacewatch ||  || align=right | 2.5 km || 
|-id=908 bgcolor=#E9E9E9
| 610908 ||  || — || May 21, 2006 || Kitt Peak || Spacewatch ||  || align=right | 1.2 km || 
|-id=909 bgcolor=#E9E9E9
| 610909 ||  || — || May 21, 2006 || Kitt Peak || Spacewatch ||  || align=right | 1.3 km || 
|-id=910 bgcolor=#fefefe
| 610910 ||  || — || July 8, 2003 || Palomar || NEAT ||  || align=right data-sort-value="0.88" | 880 m || 
|-id=911 bgcolor=#E9E9E9
| 610911 ||  || — || May 24, 2006 || Kitt Peak || Spacewatch ||  || align=right | 1.1 km || 
|-id=912 bgcolor=#d6d6d6
| 610912 ||  || — || May 5, 2006 || Kitt Peak || Spacewatch ||  || align=right | 2.6 km || 
|-id=913 bgcolor=#E9E9E9
| 610913 ||  || — || May 23, 2006 || Kitt Peak || Spacewatch ||  || align=right | 1.3 km || 
|-id=914 bgcolor=#E9E9E9
| 610914 ||  || — || May 24, 2006 || Mount Lemmon || Mount Lemmon Survey ||  || align=right | 1.6 km || 
|-id=915 bgcolor=#E9E9E9
| 610915 ||  || — || May 7, 2006 || Mount Lemmon || Mount Lemmon Survey ||  || align=right | 1.2 km || 
|-id=916 bgcolor=#d6d6d6
| 610916 ||  || — || May 25, 2006 || Mount Lemmon || Mount Lemmon Survey ||  || align=right | 2.6 km || 
|-id=917 bgcolor=#d6d6d6
| 610917 ||  || — || May 25, 2006 || Mount Lemmon || Mount Lemmon Survey ||  || align=right | 2.2 km || 
|-id=918 bgcolor=#E9E9E9
| 610918 ||  || — || December 6, 2000 || Kitt Peak || Spacewatch ||  || align=right | 1.5 km || 
|-id=919 bgcolor=#fefefe
| 610919 ||  || — || May 26, 2006 || Mount Lemmon || Mount Lemmon Survey ||  || align=right data-sort-value="0.62" | 620 m || 
|-id=920 bgcolor=#E9E9E9
| 610920 ||  || — || May 6, 2006 || Mount Lemmon || Mount Lemmon Survey ||  || align=right | 1.9 km || 
|-id=921 bgcolor=#E9E9E9
| 610921 ||  || — || May 25, 2006 || Kitt Peak || Spacewatch ||  || align=right | 1.3 km || 
|-id=922 bgcolor=#fefefe
| 610922 ||  || — || May 25, 2006 || Mount Lemmon || Mount Lemmon Survey ||  || align=right data-sort-value="0.69" | 690 m || 
|-id=923 bgcolor=#fefefe
| 610923 ||  || — || October 1, 2003 || Kitt Peak || Spacewatch ||  || align=right data-sort-value="0.68" | 680 m || 
|-id=924 bgcolor=#E9E9E9
| 610924 ||  || — || May 23, 2006 || Mount Lemmon || Mount Lemmon Survey ||  || align=right | 2.1 km || 
|-id=925 bgcolor=#E9E9E9
| 610925 ||  || — || May 31, 2006 || Mount Lemmon || Mount Lemmon Survey ||  || align=right | 1.6 km || 
|-id=926 bgcolor=#E9E9E9
| 610926 ||  || — || May 21, 2006 || Siding Spring || SSS ||  || align=right | 1.8 km || 
|-id=927 bgcolor=#E9E9E9
| 610927 ||  || — || May 25, 2006 || Mauna Kea || Mauna Kea Obs. ||  || align=right | 1.0 km || 
|-id=928 bgcolor=#E9E9E9
| 610928 ||  || — || May 25, 2006 || Mauna Kea || Mauna Kea Obs. ||  || align=right | 1.2 km || 
|-id=929 bgcolor=#fefefe
| 610929 ||  || — || May 23, 2006 || Mount Lemmon || Mount Lemmon Survey ||  || align=right data-sort-value="0.63" | 630 m || 
|-id=930 bgcolor=#E9E9E9
| 610930 ||  || — || May 25, 2006 || Mauna Kea || Mauna Kea Obs. ||  || align=right data-sort-value="0.97" | 970 m || 
|-id=931 bgcolor=#E9E9E9
| 610931 ||  || — || May 25, 2006 || Mauna Kea || Mauna Kea Obs. ||  || align=right | 1.1 km || 
|-id=932 bgcolor=#E9E9E9
| 610932 ||  || — || May 25, 2006 || Mauna Kea || Mauna Kea Obs. ||  || align=right data-sort-value="0.90" | 900 m || 
|-id=933 bgcolor=#fefefe
| 610933 ||  || — || May 6, 2006 || Mount Lemmon || Mount Lemmon Survey ||  || align=right data-sort-value="0.61" | 610 m || 
|-id=934 bgcolor=#fefefe
| 610934 ||  || — || May 25, 2006 || Kitt Peak || Spacewatch ||  || align=right data-sort-value="0.64" | 640 m || 
|-id=935 bgcolor=#E9E9E9
| 610935 ||  || — || May 22, 2006 || Kitt Peak || Spacewatch ||  || align=right data-sort-value="0.76" | 760 m || 
|-id=936 bgcolor=#E9E9E9
| 610936 ||  || — || August 10, 2016 || Haleakala || Pan-STARRS ||  || align=right | 1.4 km || 
|-id=937 bgcolor=#E9E9E9
| 610937 ||  || — || May 21, 2006 || Kitt Peak || Spacewatch ||  || align=right | 1.3 km || 
|-id=938 bgcolor=#E9E9E9
| 610938 ||  || — || October 7, 2016 || Mount Lemmon || Mount Lemmon Survey ||  || align=right | 1.6 km || 
|-id=939 bgcolor=#E9E9E9
| 610939 ||  || — || October 21, 2008 || Kitt Peak || Spacewatch ||  || align=right data-sort-value="0.87" | 870 m || 
|-id=940 bgcolor=#d6d6d6
| 610940 ||  || — || May 22, 2006 || Kitt Peak || Spacewatch ||  || align=right | 2.6 km || 
|-id=941 bgcolor=#d6d6d6
| 610941 ||  || — || October 20, 2008 || Kitt Peak || Spacewatch ||  || align=right | 2.6 km || 
|-id=942 bgcolor=#fefefe
| 610942 ||  || — || April 9, 2016 || Haleakala || Pan-STARRS ||  || align=right data-sort-value="0.64" | 640 m || 
|-id=943 bgcolor=#E9E9E9
| 610943 ||  || — || May 20, 2006 || Kitt Peak || Spacewatch ||  || align=right | 1.5 km || 
|-id=944 bgcolor=#E9E9E9
| 610944 ||  || — || July 6, 2015 || Haleakala || Pan-STARRS ||  || align=right | 1.4 km || 
|-id=945 bgcolor=#E9E9E9
| 610945 ||  || — || November 22, 2012 || Kitt Peak || Spacewatch ||  || align=right | 1.7 km || 
|-id=946 bgcolor=#d6d6d6
| 610946 ||  || — || May 19, 2006 || Mount Lemmon || Mount Lemmon Survey ||  || align=right | 2.3 km || 
|-id=947 bgcolor=#E9E9E9
| 610947 ||  || — || November 6, 2016 || Mount Lemmon || Mount Lemmon Survey ||  || align=right | 2.8 km || 
|-id=948 bgcolor=#d6d6d6
| 610948 ||  || — || May 24, 2006 || Kitt Peak || Spacewatch || 7:4 || align=right | 2.9 km || 
|-id=949 bgcolor=#E9E9E9
| 610949 ||  || — || May 26, 2006 || Kitt Peak || Spacewatch ||  || align=right | 1.3 km || 
|-id=950 bgcolor=#E9E9E9
| 610950 ||  || — || May 19, 2006 || Mount Lemmon || Mount Lemmon Survey ||  || align=right | 1.3 km || 
|-id=951 bgcolor=#E9E9E9
| 610951 ||  || — || July 28, 2011 || Haleakala || Pan-STARRS ||  || align=right | 1.00 km || 
|-id=952 bgcolor=#d6d6d6
| 610952 ||  || — || November 25, 2014 || Haleakala || Pan-STARRS ||  || align=right | 3.1 km || 
|-id=953 bgcolor=#E9E9E9
| 610953 ||  || — || October 9, 2012 || Mount Lemmon || Mount Lemmon Survey ||  || align=right | 2.1 km || 
|-id=954 bgcolor=#E9E9E9
| 610954 ||  || — || December 14, 2017 || Mount Lemmon || Mount Lemmon Survey ||  || align=right | 1.7 km || 
|-id=955 bgcolor=#E9E9E9
| 610955 ||  || — || May 27, 2006 || Catalina || CSS ||  || align=right | 1.3 km || 
|-id=956 bgcolor=#E9E9E9
| 610956 ||  || — || June 16, 2006 || Kitt Peak || Spacewatch ||  || align=right | 1.3 km || 
|-id=957 bgcolor=#d6d6d6
| 610957 ||  || — || June 16, 2006 || Kitt Peak || Spacewatch ||  || align=right | 3.0 km || 
|-id=958 bgcolor=#E9E9E9
| 610958 ||  || — || June 5, 2006 || Kitt Peak || Spacewatch ||  || align=right | 1.1 km || 
|-id=959 bgcolor=#fefefe
| 610959 ||  || — || June 21, 2006 || Kitt Peak || Spacewatch ||  || align=right data-sort-value="0.87" | 870 m || 
|-id=960 bgcolor=#E9E9E9
| 610960 ||  || — || May 7, 2006 || Kitt Peak || Spacewatch ||  || align=right | 1.8 km || 
|-id=961 bgcolor=#E9E9E9
| 610961 ||  || — || January 31, 2009 || Mount Lemmon || Mount Lemmon Survey ||  || align=right | 2.2 km || 
|-id=962 bgcolor=#d6d6d6
| 610962 ||  || — || December 31, 2008 || Kitt Peak || Spacewatch || 7:4 || align=right | 3.4 km || 
|-id=963 bgcolor=#d6d6d6
| 610963 ||  || — || November 21, 2009 || Mount Lemmon || Mount Lemmon Survey ||  || align=right | 3.5 km || 
|-id=964 bgcolor=#E9E9E9
| 610964 ||  || — || June 20, 2006 || Mount Lemmon || Mount Lemmon Survey ||  || align=right | 2.1 km || 
|-id=965 bgcolor=#E9E9E9
| 610965 ||  || — || November 13, 2012 || Mount Lemmon || Mount Lemmon Survey ||  || align=right | 1.5 km || 
|-id=966 bgcolor=#fefefe
| 610966 ||  || — || February 12, 2016 || Mount Lemmon || Mount Lemmon Survey ||  || align=right data-sort-value="0.55" | 550 m || 
|-id=967 bgcolor=#fefefe
| 610967 ||  || — || June 20, 2006 || Mount Lemmon || Mount Lemmon Survey ||  || align=right data-sort-value="0.69" | 690 m || 
|-id=968 bgcolor=#E9E9E9
| 610968 ||  || — || July 21, 2006 || Mount Lemmon || Mount Lemmon Survey ||  || align=right | 1.6 km || 
|-id=969 bgcolor=#fefefe
| 610969 ||  || — || July 21, 2006 || Mount Lemmon || Mount Lemmon Survey ||  || align=right | 1.0 km || 
|-id=970 bgcolor=#fefefe
| 610970 ||  || — || April 10, 2005 || Kitt Peak || Kitt Peak Obs. ||  || align=right data-sort-value="0.81" | 810 m || 
|-id=971 bgcolor=#E9E9E9
| 610971 ||  || — || September 4, 2011 || Haleakala || Pan-STARRS ||  || align=right | 1.6 km || 
|-id=972 bgcolor=#E9E9E9
| 610972 ||  || — || November 14, 2007 || Mount Lemmon || Mount Lemmon Survey ||  || align=right | 1.6 km || 
|-id=973 bgcolor=#E9E9E9
| 610973 ||  || — || December 17, 2003 || Kitt Peak || Spacewatch ||  || align=right | 3.3 km || 
|-id=974 bgcolor=#E9E9E9
| 610974 ||  || — || July 21, 2006 || Mount Lemmon || Mount Lemmon Survey ||  || align=right | 1.9 km || 
|-id=975 bgcolor=#C2FFFF
| 610975 ||  || — || July 19, 2006 || Mauna Kea || Mauna Kea Obs. || L4 || align=right | 5.9 km || 
|-id=976 bgcolor=#E9E9E9
| 610976 ||  || — || June 3, 2006 || Mount Lemmon || Mount Lemmon Survey ||  || align=right | 2.4 km || 
|-id=977 bgcolor=#E9E9E9
| 610977 ||  || — || July 21, 2006 || Mount Lemmon || Mount Lemmon Survey ||  || align=right | 1.2 km || 
|-id=978 bgcolor=#E9E9E9
| 610978 ||  || — || December 18, 2007 || Kitt Peak || Spacewatch ||  || align=right | 1.9 km || 
|-id=979 bgcolor=#fefefe
| 610979 ||  || — || July 25, 2006 || Mount Lemmon || Mount Lemmon Survey ||  || align=right data-sort-value="0.48" | 480 m || 
|-id=980 bgcolor=#E9E9E9
| 610980 ||  || — || September 8, 2011 || Kitt Peak || Spacewatch ||  || align=right | 1.3 km || 
|-id=981 bgcolor=#E9E9E9
| 610981 ||  || — || July 21, 2006 || Mount Lemmon || Mount Lemmon Survey ||  || align=right | 2.0 km || 
|-id=982 bgcolor=#E9E9E9
| 610982 ||  || — || August 6, 2006 || Pla D'Arguines || R. Ferrando, M. Ferrando ||  || align=right | 1.9 km || 
|-id=983 bgcolor=#fefefe
| 610983 ||  || — || May 30, 2006 || Mount Lemmon || Mount Lemmon Survey ||  || align=right data-sort-value="0.75" | 750 m || 
|-id=984 bgcolor=#fefefe
| 610984 ||  || — || August 13, 2006 || Palomar || NEAT ||  || align=right data-sort-value="0.80" | 800 m || 
|-id=985 bgcolor=#fefefe
| 610985 ||  || — || August 13, 2006 || Palomar || NEAT ||  || align=right data-sort-value="0.62" | 620 m || 
|-id=986 bgcolor=#fefefe
| 610986 ||  || — || August 15, 2006 || Siding Spring || SSS ||  || align=right data-sort-value="0.87" | 870 m || 
|-id=987 bgcolor=#d6d6d6
| 610987 ||  || — || August 13, 2006 || Palomar || NEAT ||  || align=right | 3.1 km || 
|-id=988 bgcolor=#E9E9E9
| 610988 ||  || — || May 26, 2006 || Mount Lemmon || Mount Lemmon Survey ||  || align=right | 2.4 km || 
|-id=989 bgcolor=#E9E9E9
| 610989 ||  || — || August 15, 2006 || Palomar || NEAT ||  || align=right | 2.1 km || 
|-id=990 bgcolor=#fefefe
| 610990 ||  || — || June 19, 2006 || Mount Lemmon || Mount Lemmon Survey ||  || align=right data-sort-value="0.59" | 590 m || 
|-id=991 bgcolor=#fefefe
| 610991 ||  || — || August 18, 2006 || Palomar || NEAT ||  || align=right data-sort-value="0.66" | 660 m || 
|-id=992 bgcolor=#fefefe
| 610992 ||  || — || August 17, 2006 || Piszkesteto || K. Sárneczky, Z. Kuli ||  || align=right data-sort-value="0.79" | 790 m || 
|-id=993 bgcolor=#fefefe
| 610993 ||  || — || August 19, 2006 || Kitt Peak || Spacewatch ||  || align=right data-sort-value="0.52" | 520 m || 
|-id=994 bgcolor=#E9E9E9
| 610994 ||  || — || August 20, 2006 || Kitt Peak || Spacewatch ||  || align=right | 1.7 km || 
|-id=995 bgcolor=#fefefe
| 610995 ||  || — || August 17, 2006 || Palomar || NEAT ||  || align=right data-sort-value="0.63" | 630 m || 
|-id=996 bgcolor=#fefefe
| 610996 ||  || — || August 13, 2006 || Palomar || NEAT ||  || align=right data-sort-value="0.83" | 830 m || 
|-id=997 bgcolor=#fefefe
| 610997 ||  || — || August 19, 2006 || Anderson Mesa || LONEOS ||  || align=right data-sort-value="0.80" | 800 m || 
|-id=998 bgcolor=#fefefe
| 610998 ||  || — || August 21, 2006 || Palomar || NEAT || NYS || align=right data-sort-value="0.52" | 520 m || 
|-id=999 bgcolor=#fefefe
| 610999 ||  || — || August 20, 2006 || Palomar || NEAT || (2076) || align=right | 1.1 km || 
|-id=000 bgcolor=#E9E9E9
| 611000 ||  || — || August 23, 2006 || Marly || P. Kocher ||  || align=right | 2.9 km || 
|}

References

External links 
 Discovery Circumstances: Numbered Minor Planets (610001)–(615000) (IAU Minor Planet Center)

0610